This is a list of fictional creatures and aliens from the universe of the long-running BBC science fiction television series Doctor Who, and spin-offs:Torchwood, The Sarah Jane Adventures, Class, K-9 and K-9 and Company. Note that this list only covers alien races and other fictional creatures and not specific characters, for individual characters see the lists in the separate articles below:

 List of Doctor Who villains
 List of Doctor Who henchmen
 List of Doctor Who robots

0–9

The 456

The 456 served as the main antagonists during the third series of Torchwood.

They are unnamed aliens with whom the government of the United Kingdom made a deal in 1965; the 456 extorted twelve children in return for a cure to an Earth-bound virus which was about to mutate, although one child, Clement MacDonald, ran away and escaped at the last minute. When asked for their species name by John Frobisher, they chose to use the frequency they were contacted with as their name. They seem to require (or at least prefer) a highly toxic atmosphere (25% nitrosyl chloride, 22% hydrogen chloride, 20% nitrogen, 12% fluorine, 9% hydrogen cyanide, 6% acetone, and 6% phosgene), and to be non-humanoid of form, possessing three insect like heads which appear to spew green slime whenever the creatures are aggravated or pressured. In "Day Four", parts of the 456 were briefly seen when a government operative entered its chamber with a portable video camera. It had three heads, which possessed mandibles. The rest of the body is trunklike, like a giant caterpillar. A swelling is briefly shown at the end of the creature. After the 456 return to Earth over forty years later, an ambassador of the species demanded that 10% of the world's children be given to the race as a gift, or else the entire human race would be destroyed. To ensure humanity would accept this deal, the 456 announced their arrival several days in advance by possessing and speaking through every pre-pubescent child on earth. A closer view of the visiting 456 specimen showed it had incorporated the bodies of human children into its own, the two being connected by four vine-like tentacles, because of an unnamed chemical pre-pubescents produce that the creatures use like a drug. According to the 456 themselves, such children 'feel no pain', and 'live long beyond their natural span'. The children do not appear to have physically grown, although they are wizened, perhaps mutated in some way, and appear to be aware of their surroundings and their own condition; they breathe using respirators. The 456 are responsible for the death of Ianto Jones when they release a deadly virus into Thames House, a building where Ianto was present. They are eventually defeated when Jack Harkness manages to reverse the frequency of a previous transmission made by the 456 and turn it into a weapon against them, driving them away from Earth, although he is forced to sacrifice his grandson Stephen to use him as the source of the frequency broadcast in the first place.

A

Abzorbaloff

Alien creatures, nicknamed "Abzorbaloffs", that can absorb any living thing into its body by touch and then digest the organism; one said Ursula Blake "tasted like chicken". The faces of its prey are visible on its body and are fully conscious of their surroundings. They are from the planet Clom, the twin planet of Raxacoricofallapatorius, the home planet of the Slitheen family. An Abzorbalovian disguised itself as "Victor Kennedy" and infiltrated L.I.N.D.A – a group of people trying to track down The Doctor – although it planned to absorb the Doctor's knowledge. But Elton Pope broke its cane, which was a limitation field that kept its absorbing abilities under control. Without the protecting field, the Abzorbaloff was absorbed into the Earth.

His latest appearance was in the Series 12 episode The Timeless Children in a flashback sequence.

Adipose

The Adipose are aliens composed of living fat, featured in the episode "Partners in Crime" (2008). Their breeding world, Adipose 3, was lost, causing them to turn to "Miss Foster", or Matron Cofelia of the Five Straighten Classabindi Nursery Fleet, Intergalactic Class, to create a new generation. She formulated a drug that would cause human fat (adipose tissue) to morph by parthenogenesis into Adipose children. The process is generally harmless to the host beyond the loss of body fat; but in emergencies the process can be accelerated, converting the host's entire body, which is fatal to the host and produces ill and weak Adipose children. The Shadow Proclamation forbids seeding, or breeding aliens, on a level-5 planet such as Earth. Level 5 means pre-warp capabilities, as said in "Partners in Crime." According to the "Captain Jack's Monster Files" webcast about the Adipose, the children have been made wards of the Shadow Proclamation, implying that the Adipose First Family have been sentenced for their crimes.

In the parallel universe created in "Turn Left" (2008), the Adipose incident happened in America instead of the United Kingdom, as London was destroyed when the Titanic crashed into Buckingham Palace because of the absence of the Doctor ("Voyage of the Damned"). Over 60 million Americans (roughly 20% of the total population of the United States) were killed in this timeline as a result.

In "The Stolen Earth" and "Journey's End" (2008), it is revealed that the breeding planet, Adipose 3, was one of the 27 planets relocated to the Medusa Cascade by the New Dalek Empire. After their defeat, Adipose 3 and the other planets were returned to their original positions.

In "The End of Time" (2009–10), an Adipose is shown in a bar along with other aliens the Tenth Doctor had previously encountered. Five Adipose action figures were released as part of the first series 4 wave.

Aggedor

Aggedor is the Sacred Royal Beast of the planet Peladon, where its spirit is worshiped. The real creature upon which the legend is based is a large, hairy beast with a single horn. Hunted to near extinction, one Aggedor beast roamed the tunnels below the citadel and, at one stage, was used to judge prisoners who were cast into a pit to face the Judgement of Aggedor (The Monster of Peladon, 1974).

Alpha Centauri

A hermaphroditic hexapod from Alpha Centauri which, being effectively genderless, is referred to as "it" as opposed to "he" or "she". It is tall, green, has one large blue eye, six arms, and a high-pitched voice; it wears a long yellow cape and walks with a nervous gait. It is prone to cowardice and hysterics.

Arcateenian

A translucent humanoid who possessed the body of a 19th-century prostitute named Mary was encountered in the episode "Greeks Bearing Gifts" (2006). She was a member of a race which communicated exclusively via telepathic pendants, and claimed to be a political exile, sent to Earth by a teleporter now in Torchwood's possession. At one point, "Mary" calls herself Philoctetes, in reference to his exile on Lemnos. She gave her telepathic necklace to Toshiko, and seduced her into letting her into Torchwood to regain the teleporter.

On arriving on Earth in 1812, the alien killed her guard and possessed Mary. In this form she needed to consume human hearts to maintain the host's youth, taking one a year. "Mary" threatened Tosh in order to regain the teleporter and Jack exchanged it for Tosh. However, Jack had reprogrammed the coordinates, sending "Mary" into the center of the Sun instead of back to her homeworld.

In The Sarah Jane Adventures story Invasion of the Bane (2007), Sarah Jane Smith helps an alien of the same race to find its way home. It is later revealed that this alien was a "Star Poet", from Arcateen V, who gave Sarah Jane a device via which she promised to help her with her poetry whenever she needs it. Mr Smith's Alien Files on the official The Sarah Jane Adventures website described her race as Butterfly People. The Butterfly People are also referenced in the novel Something in the Water (published March 2008) where they are called "Arcateenians".

"Mary" possessed strength large enough to shatter human bones in a manner resembling a gunshot and could move at superhuman speeds, also possessing acute senses able to notice that there was something different about Jack. The Star Poet in The Sarah Jane Adventures was able to fly home with some assistance from Sarah Jane. "Mary's" opinions of her human form seemed to be mixed: she disliked watching people talk using conventional speech; which was considered archaic on her home world, but she said she liked the body which she found "so soft, so wicked". She also expressed a dim view of human nature, considering humans to be a race who inherently desired to invade others.

A letter to Doctor Who Magazine noted "Mary"'s strong resemblance to Destrii, a companion from the magazine's Eighth Doctor comic strips. The magazine's editors concurred with the observation. Later, The Torchwood Archives by Gary Russell specified that Destrii and Mary are from the same system. Destrii's home planet Oblivion along with Devos, Krant and Arcateen IV, V and VI form the Arcan system.

The Arcateenians are mentioned in the audio book The White Wolf, when Ben remarks that the Arcateenians could have helped them get home.

B

Bane

The Bane, in their natural form, are large tentacled aliens with one eye. They appear in "Invasion of the Bane" (2007) and Enemy of the Bane (2008). They exhibit some level of mind-reading abilities. Bane Mothers are particularly large, and are known to eat members of their young who fail them. They are able to appear human through the use of image translators. The Bane sought to enslave mankind by getting them addicted to the soft drink, Bubble Shock!, which contained an organic Bane secretion that would take control of its human host when activated. Mrs Wormwood headed the Bane's disguised human front and created the Archetype, Luke.

The Beast
 
The Beast was a Satan-like creature that had been imprisoned beneath the surface of the planet Krop Tor by the Disciples of Light before the universe existed. The planet was in a permanent geo-stationary orbit around a black hole, so if the Beast was freed, the planet would fall into the black hole, destroying itself and the Beast.

Blathereen

The Blathereen are a family of Raxacoricofallapatorians, that are sworn enemies of the criminal Slitheen family. Known to be a much calmer and law-abiding clan than the Slitheen, the Blathereen made an appearance in the novel, The Monsters Inside (2005). In The Gift (2009), A family of Slitheen-Blathereen, created by the marriage of a member of both Slitheen and Blathereen families, came to Earth and tricked Sarah Jane Smith into accepting a gift of the Raxacoricofallapatorian plant, Rakweed, which began to poison the Earth with deadly spores. The Slitheen-Blathereen had no interest in the Blathereen's law-abiding ways, and instead turned to the Slitheen's greed and need to make profit. After indulging on Rakweed, which was highly sensitive to sound, Mr Smith sounded an alarm which ultimately led to the Slitheen-Blathereen exploding.

The Blessing

In Torchwood: Miracle Day (2011), The Blessing is revealed to be an antipodal geological formation connected to the Earth's morphic field running from Shanghai and Buenos Aires. Captain Jack Harkness theorises that it may have been caused by the interaction of Racnoss Huon particles and Silurian hibernation matrixes, though its origins are unknown. The Families are unsure of whether or not to classify the Blessing as alive, though it is stated to have a degree of sentience. One of its features is that it has the ability to show approaching humans the content of their own souls, which has caused some to commit suicide, others to find conviction. The Mother believed that this reaction was a result of the Blessing attempting to communicate with the human race.

In "The Blood Line" (2011), it is revealed that the worldwide immortality investigated by Torchwood was a result of Jack's blood being introduced to The Blessing's morphic field. It is implied that this was a result of the Blessing interpreting The Families' interference as a threat, and the subsequent immortality being a gift of kindness to humanity. Jack and Rex Matheson (who has been infused with Jack's blood) manage to reset the Miracle through exposing it to Jack's (now mortal) blood at each end of the Blessing. But the Blessing does not reset everything back to the way it was and, perhaps as a result of the presence of Jack's blood, brings Rex back as also immortal.

Blowfish

An otherwise-unnamed humanoid bipedal alien blowfish features in "Kiss Kiss, Bang Bang" (2008). The blowfish, played by Paul Kasey, holds part of Captain John Hart's puzzle box. It is possible that the blowfish was known to John. Overcome by Earth's pleasures, the blowfish takes cocaine, steals a sports car and takes a teenage girl hostage, only to attract the attention of Torchwood and the local media, thus leading to its eventual demise.

A young blowfish appears in the episode "Fragments" (2008), in flashback sequences involving Captain Jack Harkness' first mission for the Torchwood Institute, during which Jack captures the fish for committing various crimes but is outraged when it is shot after being captured.

A blowfish and two other fish-like creatures appear in the Torchwood Magazine short story The Book of Jahi. The blowfish has taken on the name Mr. Glee and has been operating as a crime boss in Cardiff for some time.

The blowfish appeared in "The Pandorica Opens" (2010) as part of The Alliance formed to trap the Eleventh Doctor. An inanimate stored Blowfish appears in Hedgewick's World of Wonders in the series-seven episode, "Nightmare in Silver" (2013), visited by the Doctor and Clara Oswald.

Boekind

C

Carrionite

The Carrionites appear in "The Shakespeare Code" (2007), using the power of words and witchcraft to release their species from a prison. They reappeared, this time with the Sixth Doctor, in the audio drama The Carrionite Curse.

Catkind

"The Catkind" are felines in the future that have evolved into humanoids. They are capable of interbreeding with the humans of the future. The Catkind have hair-covered bodies, feline facial features and retractable claws. Their young resemble typical domestic kittens, with humanoid features emerging after ten months.

In "New Earth" (2006), a group of Catkind called the Sisters of Plenitude ran a hospital near the city of New New York. In "Gridlock" (2007), a Cat Person, Thomas Kincade Brannigan, has a human wife and a litter of kittens.

Their latest appearance was in the Doctor Who (series 12) episode The Timeless Children, in a flashback sequence.

The Celestial Toymaker

The Celestial Toymaker was a powerful being who trapped sentient beings in childish games with their freedom as the stakes. However, the Toymaker hated to lose and the games were always rigged in his favour.

The Toymaker was mentioned in the Series 12 episode Can You Hear Me?

Chelonian

The Chelonians are a race of cybernetic humanoid tortoises who have appeared in various spin-off novels. They are a war-like race from the planet Chelonia. They are hermaphroditic and lay eggs. Some of their cybernetic enhancements include X-ray vision and improved hearing.

The first appearance of the Chelonians was in the Seventh Doctor Virgin New Adventures novel The Highest Science by Gareth Roberts. They returned in Zamper and also featured in the Fourth Doctor missing adventure The Well-Mannered War, as well as in the short stories The Hungry Bomb, Fegovy, and The Body Bank, all by Gareth Roberts and published in, respectively, the Doctor Who Magazine Yearbook 1995, the anthology Decalog 3: Consequences, and the Doctor Who Storybook 2008. They are also mentioned in the New Adventures books Oh No It Isn't! and Beyond the Sun, featuring Bernice Summerfield.   River Song listed the Chelonians amongst the races with fleets orbiting Earth in "The Pandorica Opens".

Chelonians consider humans to be parasites and often try to eliminate them. There is a pacifist faction, however, and at some point following the Doctor's recorded encounters with them, that faction took control and their society began devoting its energies to flower arrangement.

Cryons
Cryons appear to be an all female race (reproducing by parthenogenesis) who cannot exist at temperatures above zero degrees. They are tall, slim, pale and lean, with long fingers and fingernails and enlarged craniums covered with a whitish membrane. They move slowly and have echoing voices. The Cryons had advanced refrigeration technology, and lived peacefully in huge refrigerated cities until they came to the attention of the Cybermen who attempted to wipe out the Cryons in order to steal their refrigerated habitats. Unknown to the Cybermen some Cryons survived. They kept a secret base under Cyber-Control but it is unclear whether or not they survived Control's destruction.

Cyberman

The original Cybermen were a race of humanoids originating on Earth's twin planet Mondas. As they implanted more and more artificial parts into their bodies as a means of self-preservation, they became coldly logical and calculating, with emotion all but deleted from their minds. The Cybermen also have a rivalry with the Daleks.

In the two-part story "Rise of the Cybermen" and "The Age of Steel" of the second revived series (2006), the Cybermen originate on a parallel-universe version of Earth, where they were created by John Lumic, a genius obsessed with immortality. He forcibly 'upgraded' vast numbers of people in the parallel earth before a counter-revolution, initiated by the Tenth Doctor, started fighting back.

The Cyberman concept was created by Dr. Kit Pedler (the unofficial scientific advisor to the programme) and Gerry Davis in 1966. Their first appearance was in the serial The Tenth Planet. They have since been featured numerous times in their efforts to conquer and convert humanity to cyborgs like themselves.

Cybermat

Cybershade

Cybershades are a sub-species of Cybermen, except instead of a human being upgraded, the brains of cats and dogs are placed in a bronze-coloured metal head casing, with a black, furry humanoid body. They behave in a wild and feral manner, and were formidably agile, with the ability to climb buildings and jump from great heights. They first appeared in the 2008 Christmas special, "The Next Doctor", under the control of Miss. Mercy Hartigan as the CyberKing.

D

Dæmon

A race of humanoids from the planet Dæmos. Their appearance is that of classic demons, because Earth's notion of demons derives from them. They are not exactly evil, but have a morality much different from humans, and have no qualms about doing humans harm.

Dalek

A war-like race of mutant creatures who live within mobile battle armor. They are life-long enemies of The Doctor, and he is the only being whom they fear. They are bent on destroying all life forms in the universe other than themselves. The creatures themselves resemble squid, with a single eye, exposed brain and many tentacles. They first appeared in the 1963 serial The Daleks, the second Doctor Who serial.

Dalek Puppet

A Dalek puppet is a living or dead creature that has been partially converted into a Dalek by Dalek Nanogenes. Puppets normally retain their original appearance but, in humanoids, when activated can extrude a miniature Dalek eyestalk and gunstick—in; the eyestalk coming from the forehead and the gunstick from the hand. If needed, the subject's pre-puppet memories can be accessed. Victims can be brought back to their senses by repeated insults to their character, such as the Doctor gave Tasha Lem. Time Lords cannot be converted into Dalek puppets.

Demon
Demons have appeared in Doctor Who several times, the first being in Third Doctor serial The Dæmons (1971, see dæmons above); there, they were specifically aliens from the planet Dæmos who had come to Earth in the distant past, with their existence becoming ingrained in myth. The "demon" Azal was summoned by The Master's will for ill purposes that the Doctor, with the literally vital aid of Jo Grant, was able to block.

In 2006, both the Tenth Doctor series of Doctor Who and its spin-off Torchwood expanded on the possibility of actual malicious supernatural entities existing in the Doctor Who universe. "The Impossible Planet" introduced the Beast, a Satan-like demon remaining from the universe before our own, sealed in planet Krop Tor by the "Disciples of Light".

Later, in the Torchwood episode "End of Days"', the villainous Bilis Manger freed "Abaddon, son of the great Beast" from within the Rift, where he, like the Beast, had been imprisoned since "before time".  Manger had schemed to ensure Abaddon's freedom, manipulating the Torchwood Three crew. Bilis refers to Abaddon as his "god". Abaddon killed all those who fell in his shadow; he devoured life. Captain Jack Harkness attempted to sacrifice himself by using his immortality to destroy the demon when it tried to absorb too much, leaving Jack dead for days but causing the monster to choke to death. It is also referred to in the second revived series (2006) of Doctor Who by the Ood in the episode "The Impossible Planet" in terms of the Beast's various aliases: "Some may call it Abaddon."

Dominator

Draconian

The Draconians (also called Dragons, a derogatory term) are a humanoid race encountered in the 26th century. They have tall, pointed heads with prominent brows, pointed ears, and patches of scaly skin. Common interstellar travel and attempts at colonization have brought them into frequent and occasionally hostile contact with humans, leading to a treaty establishing a frontier between the two empires. The Draconians are very intelligent, honorable, and at least as advanced as their human counterparts. They have appeared only in the Third Doctor serial Frontier in Space (1973). The Doctor mentioned that he arm wrestled with one at some point.

Dwarf Mordant

Dwarf Mordant is an alien from a race known as the Salakans, a race that is interested to be the top salesman throughout the galaxy. According to Wally K. Daly's Doctor Who The Ultimate Evil, Mordant tries to be the top salesman by being in an arms deal with building a hate ray in space and with the help of Escoval to break the rules of the First Families and open the Armory to start a war. But surrenders under the Doctor's condition to leave the planet and shut down his hate ray for peace and trade somewhere else.

Drahvin

E

Eknodine

The Eminence
The Eminence is a gestalt entity which exists as a brown gas which suffocates humanoid life forms before possessing them and turning them into deathless footsoldiers for its army. Its first appearance was in the Sixth Doctor Audio Adventure, The Seeds of War. It has since been present throughout the Dark Eyes series featuring the Eighth Doctor, which explored its origin and final defeat after the Doctor was forced to ally with the Daleks, and has featured in the Fourth Doctor audio play episode Destroy the Infinite (which served as a prequel to Seeds).

Eternals
The Eternals are a race of cosmic beings first introduced in the Doctor Who serial Enlightenment  with the Fifth Doctor (Peter Davison) in 1983.

An Eternal who called himself Striker explains to the Doctor that he and his people live outside of time, in the realm of eternity. They consider the mortal inhabitants of the universe to be "Ephemerals", including even the Time Lords of the planet Gallifrey. Striker seems completely unaware of the existence of the Time Lords before meeting the Doctor.

In the Enlightenment serial, the Doctor eventually realizes that the Eternals are powerful enough to manipulate matter, creating objects out of thin air; they also read minds effortlessly through telepathy. They lack imagination and creativity, indeed saying they were empty and lost without Ephemeral thought to entertain and challenge them, and thus were dependent on Ephemerals to keep them active and prevent them from withering away in boredom. Without Ephemerals, the Eternals have no purpose.

On one occasion, the Doctor manages to outwit an Eternal attempt to destroy a rival ship by throwing a planted explosive target off the ship, noting that the Eternals couldn't have accomplished that because they lacked the imagination to think of such an action. This dependence was not something they liked admitting to, however, and they made boasts several times of how they could manipulate the reality around them through sheer force of will. Despite this great power, they deferred to the Guardians of Time, specifically the White Guardian and the Black Guardian, who offered the Eternals "enlightenment" – complete knowledge of good and evil – if they won a cosmic race. The Eternals captured many Ephemerals to win the race for them, hence accidentally bringing about the attention of the Doctor who immediately saw them as a threat.

They have been mentioned in the new TV series that began in 2005. In the episode "Army of Ghosts," the Doctor mentioned the existence of a "nowhere place" that exists between parallel universes and alternate timelines, saying that his people called it the Void while "the Eternals called it the Howling."

In the later episode "The Shakespeare Code" (2007), the alien witches called Carrionites claimed that the Eternals banished them "into deep darkness" soon after the "dawn of the universe."

F

Fendahl

A race that never exceeds unlucky number 13; it is composed of one Golden Core and 12 Fendahleen. The Fendahl arose on the original fifth planet of our solar system, which they eventually wiped of all other life; so dangerous were they that the Time Lords moved the planet into a time loop. Somehow, though, the Fendahl managed to eject a skull, which passed through space (seriously harming life on Mars as it passed) to land on Earth, where its powers helped shape humanity, a new vessel for the Fendahl.  Ages later, that skull was found by scientists, who believed it could grant them power; the attempt unfortunately backfired in the creation of a new Golden Core. The Core began creating Fendahleen, but one person committed suicide, preventing the Fendahl from reaching the quota. The Fourth Doctor blew up the house the Fendahl were in, and later tossed the skull that caused the trouble into a supernova.

The Fendahl also appear in the Doctor Who novel The Taking of Planet 5, when a group of Time Lords from the Future War (a war that the Eighth Doctor had learned would be waged between the Time Lords and an unknown Enemy in his personal future, distinct from the Time War of the modern series) attempted to break the time lock around Planet Five to unleash the Fendahl to use it as a weapon in the war, only to unleash a creature described as the Maemeovore, a devourer of concept that had evolved to prey on the Fendahl itself as time inside the lock was accelerated, the Doctor only just managing to banish the Maemeovore out of the universe.

They returned in the Torchwood audio, Night of the Fendahl and the Eighth Doctor Adventures audio, Island of the Fendahl, both released in 2019.

Fenric

Fenric is an ancient evil alien entity.

Fisher King

An alien warlord that once conquered Tivoli and possesses the ability to turn living beings into ghosts, the Fisher King was tricked by the Twelfth Doctor into believing that he had been turned into a ghost, which was a decoy in order for the Fisher King to be killed in an oncoming flood.

Foamasi

The Foamasi are an intelligent, bipedal race of reptiles resembling humanoid chameleons; they appeared in the 1980 Fourth Doctor story The Leisure Hive, by David Fisher. The race's name is a near-anagram of the word "mafioso". The Foamasi fought and won a 20-minute nuclear war with the Argolin. They communicate by means of chirps and clicks, translated by an interpreting device held in the mouth. Although they became mostly a peaceful race from having learned the error of their ways from the devastating war, a renegade faction called the West Lodge exists and frequently attempts to revive hostilities between the two races.

After their victory, the Argolin's home planet of Argolis was officially owned by the Foamasi government. Two saboteurs from the West Lodge tried to force the Argolins to sell them the Leisure Hive, so they could use it as a new base. They were thwarted by a group of Foamasi, one claiming to be a member of the Foamasi government, who used a web-spewing gun to ensnare them and return them to their home planet. Some Foamasi disguise themselves as humanoids by fitting into skin-suits which are smaller than the Foamasi's own bodies.

A Foamasi assassin appears in the Eighth Doctor Adventures novel Placebo Effect by Gary Russell. In this novel, it is explained that the Foamasi can fit into disguises smaller than their bodies because their bones are hollow and collapsible.

Futurekind

A cannibalistic humanoid species with sharp teeth and warrior-like markings over their faces, the Futurekind are believed to be what humans will become at the very end of the universe. They hunt weaker humans in large packs, and use fire torches as a way of intimidating their prey. They only encountered the Tenth Doctor and his companions, Martha Jones and Captain Jack Harkness, in "Utopia" (2007), when the TARDIS inadvertently took them to the very end of the universe.

Fleshkind

The Flood 
The Flood is a viral entity resembling water found on Mars. The Tenth Doctor speculates that they may have been imprisoned by the Ice Warriors within a glacier. The Mars base Buoy Base One utilizes the glacier for water but when one of their water filter breaks the Flood begins to infect the personal. Transforming them into a zombie like state that can produce the infectious water, with unusual electrical activity in the brain and blacked teeth. As the Flood over run the base with the intent of reaching earth the Doctor decides he must leave knowing that the base's destruction in a fixed point in time that can't be changed. However he soon returns but the base's leader, Adelaide Brooke activates the base's self destruct feature. Arrogantly breaking the laws the Doctor manages to save the remaining crew not infected by the water and the flood is destroyed with the base. Returning to Earth the Doctor declares himself the Time Lord Victorious but realises he's gone too far when Adelaide takes her own life to preserve humanity's future.

G

Gelth

The Gelth appeared in the Ninth Doctor episode "The Unquiet Dead" (2005). They were a new race of alien villains that the Doctor and Rose Tyler encountered in the 2005 revived series. They were the first element of the new series that attracted attention for being "too scary". Following complaints, many of which were made by Mediawatch UK, the BBC stated that in future, episodes of that nature would be forewarned by a statement of "may not be suitable for under 8s".

The Gelth were blue gaseous life-forms. They claimed to have lost their corporeal forms as a consequence of the Last Great Time War, though later actions by the Gelth put the truth of this statement in doubt. They arrived on Earth via the Spacetime Rift at an undertaker's house in Cardiff in 1869. Their forms could not be maintained in Earth's atmosphere without suspension in a gaseous medium, so they inhabited the gas pipes common to Victorian era households. Further, though, they also would take possession of recently deceased corpses. When possessing corpses, they look much like ordinary humans (provided that the corpse has yet to enter the autolytic stage of decomposition), with only two fundamental differences: their irises vanish or turn white, and blue veins are clearly visible on their ghastly pale skin. Gelth make an unearthly shrieking noise for an unknown reason, particularly when they've possessed someone.

Claiming to be on the verge of extinction, the Gelth convinced the Doctor to aid their entrance to Earth via Gwyneth, the undertaker's servant girl, who had developed psychic powers due to growing up near the Rift. The Gelth actually numbered in the billions and intended to take the Earth by force, and to use its murdered population as vessels for themselves. The Gelth were thwarted when Gwyneth sacrificed herself, blowing up the building and sealing the Rift. Whether all the Gelth that came through the rift perished is unclear.

In "Army of Ghosts" (2006), Rose asked whether "ghostshifting" Cybermen might have been Gelth, which the Tenth Doctor stated was not the case.

In "The Unicorn and the Wasp" (2008), Donna Noble compared Agatha Christie being surrounded by murders to meeting Charles Dickens at Christmas while he's surrounded by ghosts. The Doctor gave a "Well..." to a disbelieving Donna; Dickens was with his previous incarnation and Rose when the Gelth attempted to attack at Christmas, and the gaseous form of the Gelth could lead to their being classed "ghosts".

Graske

The Graske are a mischievous race of diminutive aliens from the planet Griffoth. They transmat themselves through time and space to abduct individuals out of their own time and replace them with a Graske. Disguised Graske can be identified by a green glow that sometimes appears in their eyes. They first appeared in the interactive Doctor Who mini-episode "Attack of the Graske" (2005).

A Graske named Krislok appears in The Sarah Jane Adventures stories Whatever Happened to Sarah Jane? (2007) and The Temptation of Sarah Jane Smith (2008). Originally a henchman and slave of the Trickster, who saved him from death, Krislok later gains his freedom. An unnamed Graske appears in The Proms mini-episode "Music of the Spheres" (2008), as does another at the Zaggit Zagoo space bar in "The End of Time" (2010).

All live-action depictions of a Graske have been played by Jimmy Vee.

Great Intelligence

Groske

Groske look like Graske but are blue; they also talk like the Graske. They first appeared in Death of the Doctor (2010), where they were seen working for UNIT. One of the Groske saves Clyde Langer, Rani Chandra, and Santiago Jones from the villainous vulture-like Shansheeth.

Groske can detect artron energy (claiming it "smells"), and they dislike the Graske.

Guardian
 The two powerful entities in charge of keeping balance in the universe. Neither may become directly involved in the affairs of the universe, but either may choose agents to do his bidding (the White Guardian chose the Doctor, while the Black Guardian chose the Shadow and Vislor Turlough).

Spin-off media has revealed that there are six Guardians overall; White, Black, Crystal, Red, Bronze and Gold, with the other four representing Dreams, Justice, Equilibrium and Life respectively. The novel Divided Loyalties identifies the Doctor's old foe the Celestial Toymaker as the Crystal Guardian of Dreams, but the other three have not explicitly appeared in any media yet.

H

Haemovore 

Haemovores appeared in the Seventh Doctor story The Curse of Fenric (1989) by Ian Briggs. Vampiric creatures that fed on blood, they were the result of human evolution in a possible far future, caused by millennia of pollution. As part of his final game against the Doctor, the entity known as Fenric transported the most powerful Haemovore, called the "Ancient One", through time to Viking Age Northumbria. There it waited, trapped beneath the North Sea for centuries, occasionally drawing victims into the water and transforming them into Haemovores.

Soon after the transformation, victims appeared much as they did in life, except for elongated fingernails and a corpse-like pallor. Later they became deformed blue-grey humanoids covered in octopus-like suckers. The Ancient One was the least human in appearance; in its own time, it was the last living thing on Earth.

During World War II, Fenric released the Ancient One. Fenric's plan was that the Ancient One was to release the toxin which would pollute the world and thus create its own future.

The Haemovores had the ability to hypnotically paralyse their victims so they could feed and drain them of blood. Not all of their victims were turned into Haemovores, although the selection process was never explained. The Haemovores were impervious to most forms of attack, surviving being shot at close range by a submachine gun at one point. They could be destroyed in the traditional vampire-killing fashion of driving a stake through their chests. They could also be repelled by their victim's faith, which formed a psychic barrier, like the Doctor's faith in his companions, Ace's faith in the Doctor, Captain Sorin's faith in the Communist Revolution, and even the Reverend Wainwright's failing faith in God; this repelling force can be called into will, the Doctor merely called the names of past companions as a medium.

Ultimately, the Seventh Doctor convinced the Ancient One to turn against Fenric, and it released the toxin within a sealed chamber, destroying itself and Fenric's host. Whether this means that the future the Ancient One came from was averted is not clear, although the Doctor seemed to think so.

Fenric and his Haemovores return in the 2012 Big Finish Productions audio story, Gods and Monsters.

Hath 

The Hath are aliens that appear as tall, roughly humanoid creatures with fish-like heads, who can breathe in air via the employment of apparatus fitted to their faces that incorporates a canister of green liquid. They are intelligent, emotional creatures – one formed a friendship with Martha Jones, and saved her life at the cost of its own. They seem sentient and while they do not speak a language intelligible to humans, the two races planned to colonize the planet Messaline together. However, they later turned on each other – before their eventual reconciliation, thanks to the Doctor's intervention.

The Monster Files feature states that the Hath joined and assisted early human space colonisation.

The Hath returned for an appearance in the second part of "The End of Time" (2010), where they are seen in an alien bar, and they are seen briefly in "The Eleventh Hour" (2011) in a clip illustrating the Doctor's role as protector of the Earth, suggesting that they have visited the planet at some point prior to 2010.  They also appeared in an alien bar for the first episode of season 9.

Headless Monks 

The Headless Monks are a religious order that can be converted from any humanoid species by the removal of the head. They wear hooded cloaks, giving the impression that they still have a head, however under the hood, the skin is tied into a tight knot where the head has been removed.  Despite their name, most people are unaware of this literal description being true, because except under very special circumstances, one incurs a death penalty if they ever remove the hood of a monk. The monks have no detectable life signs, and are endowed with the ability to throw lightning from their hands. They were first mentioned in "The Time of Angels" (2010), but did not appear until "A Good Man Goes To War" (2011).

Hoix 

A Hoix features in the Torchwood episode "Exit Wounds" (2008); the first time its name has been mentioned on screen, having previously been seen in the Doctor Who episode "Love & Monsters" two years before. Owen distracts it by feeding it cigarettes stating that it "lives to eat". They are not very intelligent, being easily tricked by Owen into being vulnerable for a knock-out blow to the head; it has been seen animalisticly chasing Rose and the Tenth Doctor in its first appearance. One appeared as a member of the Alliance to seal the Eleventh Doctor in the Pandorica in "The Pandorica Opens" (2010). A Hoix was also mentioned in the novel The Twilight Streets.

I

Ice Warrior

J

Judoon 

The Judoon are galactic alien police resembling rhinoceroses that work for the Shadow Proclamation. They appeared in the series 3 Sarah Jane Adventures story, Prisoner of the Judoon, in pursuit of a Veil life form known as Androvax that escaped from a crashed Judoon prison transport. They have relatively low intelligence levels but possess sophisticated technology such as H2O Scoops that are capable of lifting large buildings and Thermal Guns that are able to disintegrate targets.

The Judoon first appeared as a major alien in the Doctor Who episode "Smith and Jones" as well as the episodes "The Pandorica Opens".

The Judoon have battled the Thirteenth Doctor in the episode Fugitive of the Judoon.

K

Kahler 

A highly technologically advanced humanoid species with unique patterns on the left side of their faces to reflect their individuality. A Kahler doctor, Kahler-Jex, encountered the Eleventh Doctor, Amy Pond and Rory Williams in a small American frontier town known as Mercy, where it became apparent that he was responsible for the creation of a deadly Kahler cyborg, who was now hunting him down to execute Kahler-Jex for his crimes against the Kahler species. The Kahler race were created by Toby Whithouse.

Kaled 

A species of humanoids from the planet Skaro who evolved into the fearsome and warlike Daleks.

Kinda 

Kinda (pronounced "Kin-duh") are a species of human-like people. At first glance, one would assume they are similar to the caveman age humans. However, their necklaces seem similar to a double helix, implying they are smarter than they appear. They have legends of the Mara, and are warned not to dream alone to keep it away. The men of the Kinda are not allowed to speak, but if one does, a prophecy says all Kinda will. They have women similar to shamans, they speak almost fluently; when the elder dies, her spirit and knowledge enter her apprentice. A child in the Kinda tribe could have up to seven fathers, though this hasn't been elaborated on; although it could be one biological father and six stepfathers.

Kraal 

The Kraals reappear in a Big Finish story called 'The Oseidon Adventure', which was released in June 2012 as part of the Fourth Doctor Adventures.

Krafayis 

The Krafayis appear in the episode "Vincent and the Doctor" (2010). It appears to be invisible to most people, however Vincent van Gogh can see it. It is suggested that this is because of his mental illness.

Krargs 
Krargs appear in the unfinished serial Shada and consequently in its later Big Finish/BBCi remake. They are artificial crystalline organisms with rudimentary mobility and understanding of simple commands, created and controlled by the main antagonist, Skagra, to aid in his plan to forcefully merge all of the minds in the Universe into a single omnipotent entity.

Krillitane 

The Krillitanes are a race who take attributes from other races to change their appearance. In the episode "School Reunion" (2006), the Tenth Doctor states that he has encountered them before, but that due to their composite nature, they looked different, hence him not recognizing them. He also states that they gain their composite nature from consuming other beings.

In order to solve the Skasis Paradigm, which would enable them to control the entire universe, they assume control of a school and take over, with many assuming human forms and taking roles such as teachers and catering staff – the Krillitane leader Brother Lassar takes on the role of the headteacher, using the alias "Mr Finch". The pupils are served free lunches which contain chips coated with Krillitane oil, which is toxic to the Krillitanes themselves, but is harmless to humans, and when consumed, causes increased intelligence – when the Doctor asks Rose (who had also eaten the chips) what is 59 times 35, she immediately answers the question correctly (2,065). But the oil is also extremely flammable, and when K9 ignites it, the ensuing explosion destroys the school and the Krillitanes inside. Later in the episode, right before the end, however, K9 is revealed to have been switched with a new model, a gift to Sarah Jane Smith.

Kroton

Krynoid 

The Krynoids appeared in the Fourth Doctor story The Seeds of Doom by Robert Banks Stewart. They are a highly dangerous, sentient form of plant life which are renowned amongst galactic botanists. They spread via seed pods which travel in pairs and are violently hurled through space by frequent volcanic eruptions on their unnamed home planet. The pods when opened are attracted to flesh and are able to infect and mingle their DNA with that of the host, taking over their body and slowly transforming them into a Krynoid. The species can also exert a form of telepathic control over other plant life in the surrounding area, making it suddenly dangerous and deadly to animal-kind. In the later stages of development the Krynoid can also control the vocal cords of its victims and can make itself telepathically sympathetic to humans. Fully grown Krynoids are many meters high and can then release hordes of seed pairs for further colonisation.

Two pods arrived on Earth at the South Pole during the prehistoric Pleistocene era and remained dormant in Antarctica until discovered at the end of the twentieth century. One of them hatched after being exposed to ultra-violet light, and took control of a nearby human scientist. The Fourth Doctor intervened in the nick of time and ensured the Krynoid was destroyed by a bomb, but the second pod was stolen and taken to the home of millionaire botanist Harrison Chase in England. Chase ensured the germination of the second pod, which overtook his scientific adviser Arnold Keeler, and transformed its subject over time into a virtually full-sized Krynoid. Unable to destroy the creature by other means, and with the danger of a seed release imminent from the massive plant, the Doctor orchestrated an RAF bombing raid to destroy the creature before it could germinate.

The Krynoid are also featured in the Eighth Doctor audio story for Big Finish entitled Hothouse, where an environmentalist group uses samples from the original Krynoid to try and create hybrids that can be controlled by the human host and thus control Earth's fauna to cope with the environmental damage, only for their efforts to merely create a rapidly-growing Krynoid before the Doctor sets it on fire. Also featured in BBV audios The Root of All Evil, and The Green Man.

A Krynoid appears as one of the villains in the Eleventh Doctor short story collection Tales of Trenzalore, as one of the creatures attacking Trenzalore during the Doctor's defence of the planet ("The Time of the Doctor", 2013), the Doctor defeating the Krynoid by blasting it with rapidly-freezing water from a specially modified hose and then shattering it with the reverberations of the town bell.

M

Macra 

The Macra first appear in the 1967 Second Doctor story The Macra Terror by Ian Stuart Black. They are an intelligent, giant crab-like species from an unnamed planet colonised by humanity in the future. The Macra invade the control center of the colony and seize the levers of power without the colonists – including their Pilot – knowing what had happened. Thereafter the Macra only appear at night, when the humans are in their quarters, observing a curfew. They have strong hypnotic powers which alter human perception. They also have the ability to ensure messages are vocalised through electronic apparatus such as television or sensor speakers. Both these tools are used to keep the human colonists under control, believing they are blissfully happy. This provides a cover for the Macra to use the colonists as miners in a vast gas mine. The gas is deadly to the miners but vital to the Macra, enabling them to move more quickly and rejuvenating their abilities. The Second Doctor effects a revolution on the Macra planet and helps engineer an explosion in the control centre, destroying the Macra in charge.

The Macra are also featured in the 2007 episode "Gridlock", becoming the first one-off opponent of the Doctor in the classic series to appear in the revived series, with the Zygons reappearing in the Eleventh Doctor story, "The Day of the Doctor" (2013). In the episode, some Macra are found to be alive below New New York, a city of New Earth. They live in the thick fog of exhaust gases on the main motorway under the city, tracking the flying cars by their lights and snatching at them when they get too close. The Doctor says that the species is billions of years old and once developed a small empire as "the scourge of this galaxy", but the Macra beneath New New York must have devolved into nothing more than beasts.

Mara

Martian 
In the Doctor Who universe, the planet Mars is home to two known forms of sentient life: the Ice Warriors, a race of reptilian humanoids, and The Flood, a sentient, water-borne virus encountered by the first human base on Mars in the episode "The Waters of Mars" (2009). The Tenth Doctor was incorrectly identified as a Martian by Donna Noble during their meeting in "The Runaway Bride" (2006), with the Empress of the Racnoss.

Menoptra 

The Menoptra (spelled Menoptera in the novelisation of the serial) appeared in the First Doctor story The Web Planet, by Bill Strutton (1965). They are an intelligent, bipedal insectoid species from the planet Vortis. In appearance, they resemble a cross between giant butterflies and bees, with each Menoptra possessing four large wings. They have yellow and black stripes around their bodies and appear to be around six feet tall, but do not seem to have typical insect body parts (such as mandibles or an abdomen).

Peaceful and kindly by nature, the Menoptra move in a unique, stylised way and their vocal inflections are stilted. They were very welcoming of the First Doctor, Ian, Barbara, and Vicki; but showed an animosity towards their fellow insectoids, the Zarbi, as well as an abhorrence for the Animus, a hostile alien intelligence that had taken over the originally passive Zarbi and almost all of Vortis. Once it was clear that the Doctor was willing to help them defeat the Animus, they were only too glad to assist in any way they could.

Menoptra born without wings are considered second-class citizens.

A Menoptra and a Zarbi were shown on cover of the first edition of Doctor Who Annual in September 1965 along with two other Doctor Who alien races, a Voord and a Sensorite.

Minotaur 

An alien Minotaur was imprisoned in a prison that resembled that of an Earth hotel in "The God Complex" (2011), however this "hotel" had never-ending corridors, and so established itself as a God, feeding from the fears of the beings that find them trapped in the hotel. The Eleventh Doctor realised that actually, the Minotaur is feeding on the people's faith that something or someone will save them from their worst fears, and so temporarily encourages his companion Amy Pond to lose her faith in him, which eventually allows the Minotaur to die peacefully in the corridors of the hotel. The Doctor mentions that this alien species of Minotaur are cousins of the Nimon.

Monk 

The Monks are an alien race of shapeshifting humanoids that can choose their appearance at will; on Earth, they chose to resemble human corpses. The Monks study other planets through virtual simulations and take over by having someone in power consent to their rule out of love.

In "Extremis" (2017), the simulated version of the Twelfth Doctor eventually realized the truth and emailed a recording of the Monks' simulation to the real Twelfth Doctor through his sonic sunglasses, warning him of the coming invasion.

In "The Pyramid at the End of the World" (2017), the Monks showed the assembled world leaders a future where the Earth would be destroyed in one year by bacteria and offered to protect them as their rulers. The Doctor planned to stop the bacteria by blowing up the laboratory where it was found, but realized he could not escape the explosion due to his blindness. Unwilling to let her friend die, Bill Potts consented to the Monks' rule in return for the Doctor's eyesight, allowing him to escape.

In "The Lie of the Land" (2017), the Monks ruled over Earth for six months and kept the humans control by broadcasting a revised version of the planet's history that included the Monks from the beginning. Bill, the lynchpin through whom the fake history was broadcast, broke her psychic link with the Monks by broadcasting pure memories of her mother, causing the Monks to lose control over humanity and ultimately retreat from Earth.

Movellan 

The Movellans, who made their first appearance in the Fourth Doctor serial Destiny of the Daleks (1979), are an android species originating from outside the galaxy. They were adversaries of the Daleks.

Movellans outwardly resemble physically attractive humans of various ethnicities and genders. All Movellan androids wear white, form-fitting uniforms and have silver hair braided in a dreadlock style. They are stronger and have more physical endurance than human beings. A major weakness of the Movellan design is an external power pack which each android carries on its belt. This can be removed with comparative ease, causing the android to completely shut down. Once removed the power pack circuitry can be reprogrammed so that the android will obey the orders of another being.

The Movellans are mentioned again in Resurrection of the Daleks (1984), where a virus of their invention was central to that story's plot. They also appear in "The Pilot" (2017), where they are seen fighting the Daleks.

Mentors 

Mentors are amphibious capitalists who first appear in the serial "Vengeance on Varos".

MetalKind

Midnight Entity
The Midnight Entity is the conjectural name given to a mysterious being encountered by the Doctor in the episode Midnight (Doctor Who). The natural appearance of this organism is not directly known, only being referred to as a shadow, "something shifting. Like it was running". The creature was capable of possessing humans. First unable to move, it repeats what other people say, then begins saying what they are saying at the same time, then is capable of moving, taking over other people.

N

Nestene 

The Nestenes are a race of amorphous aliens who can control all forms of plastic, creating Autons. Since the Last Great Time War destroyed their food supply planets, the Nestenes have been seeking replacements.

Nimon 

Black Minotaur-like beings with red eyes that go to other planets, posing as Gods. However, they are nothing more than a parasitic race that bleed planets dry before moving on to new ones in a repeating cycle. They are cousins to the Minotaur species that the Eleventh Doctor encountered in "The God Complex" (2011). While one posed as a God, it acquired sacrifices to be used as batteries for powering their teleporter. However, the Doctor's arrival prevented more than two extra Nimons from arriving; the rest tried a last-resort plan by blowing up their now resource-deprived planet, killing them all.

O

Ogron 

Ogrons are mercenaries employed by various parties to "do their dirty work" throughout the universe. They strongly resemble Orcs or Uruk-hai from The Lord of the Rings, being large humanoids with thick gray skin, protruding brow ridges, and thick, tangled hair. They primarily employ stun weapons, and have been employed by both the Daleks and the Master on at least one occasion. They first appeared in the Third Doctor serial Day of the Daleks (1972).

Ood

Ogri 

The Ogri appeared in the Fourth Doctor story The Stones of Blood (1978) by David Fisher.

The Ogri were a species of silicon-based creatures native to Ogros. They looked like large rocks, usually taller than a human but irregular in shape. They were large, slow and heavy, sometimes weighing as much as 3.5 tons, but they could take a lot of damage, both energy-based and physical. When they were awake, they would glow and make a loud rumbling noise. Like other silicon-based lifeforms, they broke down into grit when killed and also left silicon behind when they moved. They fed on various types of proteins which were common on Ogros. When on Earth, the Ogri had to rely on the globulin in blood, which they could absorb by touch. Ogri were not shown to communicate and did not show any signs of intelligence. Ogri had long lifespans, living for thousands of years. Cessair of Diplos took three Ogri from Ogros, which she used for protection and to impress the humans of Earth. These Ogri waited with the Nine Travellers until they were awoken by Cessair or her followers.

Augmented Ogri were used by the Galactic Federation as doormen.

At least one Ogri was discovered on Earth prior to 1983, and ended up in the care of Isaac Summerfield in Little Caldwell. It resided in the cemetery and was routinely fed blood to keep it docile. It was instrumental in saving Little Caldwell from the attention of NATO, by killing a rogue NATO commander responsible for a number of abductions (both alien and human).

Optera 

The Optera appeared in the First Doctor story The Web Planet (1965) by Bill Strutton. These caterpillar-like creatures were once Menoptra, but they elected to instead burrow under the ground and abandon the world of light and flight above. It is implied that they may have been driven there by the malevolent Animus.

They have larger eyes than their Menoptra brethren, and have no wings. However, they have numerous arms and appear to "hop" in a stylised way. They speak with inflection different from that of their bee-like cousins, but their speech is a strange dialect of the language of the "upper world" and words and phrases they have coined for themselves.

At the story's end, the Animus is defeated and the Optera are persuaded to return to the surface, where they look forward to their children learning the joys of flight; implying that once back on the surface the Optera will redevelop wings.

P

Peladonian 

Peladonians appear humanoid, but are still in an age of a lack of advanced technology; at least when the Third Doctor visits the first time, when Peladon is being considered admittance into a galactic alliance. In the Doctor's first adventure, Peladon was ruled by a half human king named after the planet; his second trip saw him meeting King Peladon's daughter, a 1/4 human queen.

Pied Piper 
Based on the mythical piper in the fairytale, the Pied Piper was an energy entity from the Jeggorabax Cluster, home to beings that feed on emotions. The species' spacecraft resembled meteorites; one such ship crash landed on Earth in the Weserbergland Mountains, Lower Saxony in 1283. Feeding off the emotion of fear, it assumed the human disguise of The Pied Piper and stole away all the children of the town of Hamelin, creating fear from parents.

The First Doctor, John and Gillian first meet the Pied Piper in the comic Challenge of the Piper. This is also the first story to ever feature the Pied Piper in Doctor Who. Over the centuries, the creature continued to abduct children and terrify their parents, using many guises including Odd Bob the Clown, who kidnapped children in wartime New York. In the 2009 story The Day of the Clown, posing as both the ringmaster Elijah Spellman and as Odd Bob, the entity established a museum in Ealing named Spellman's Magical Museum of the Circus, made possible by the presence of the Weserbergland Meteorite at the Pharos Institute. Because of Sarah Jane Smith's affiliation with Pharos, she broke some of the meteorite and used it to trap the alien in it, after having weakened it by laughing at its clown form instead of fearing it. The meteorite was then sealed in a special emotion-proof container made out of Halconite steel in Sarah Jane's attic.

Plasmavore 

Plasmavores are shape-changing aliens that live on haemoglobin. They absorb blood from their victims, which in turn changes their own blood chemistry to that of the victim, allowing them to mimic other species when medically scanned. A Plasmavore was hiding from the Judoon in the Royal Hope Hospital on Earth, disguised as Florence Finnegan.

P'ting 

The P'ting have toxic skin, and will eat anything that is not organic including the Thirteenth Doctor's energy from her sonic screwdriver. Tim Price was credited for the creation of the P'ting in The Tsuranga Conundrum.

Pyrovile 

Hailing from the planet Pyrovillia these creatures had bodies made of rock that seemed to contain fire. Much taller than humans their heads resembled centurion helmets and they could be killed by contact with water. When their home planet vanished they fled a crash landed on earth reducing many of them to dust. They remained dormant beneath Vesuvius for centauries until an earthquake in Pompeii awoke them. They began to plan the conquest of earth using the city's soothsayers to their advantage. By having them inhale the dust of those destroyed in the crash the people of Pompeii began to turn to stone and would eventually become new Pyroviles. The Tenth Doctor learns of their plans to conquer Earth and boil the oceans and finds their lair in the heart of the volcano. But he learns that due to them using the volcano's power they are preventing the infamous eruption. Realizing that it was "Pompeii or the world" the Doctor and Donna reverse the machine triggering Vesuvius' eruption which destroys the Pyrovile.

Q

Queen Bat

Quill 

The Quill were a humanoid species from the planet Rhodia who had a long history of war with the other species on Rhodia, the Rhodians. All the Rhodians and the Quill were killed by the Shadow Kin, except the Prince of Rhodia and Andra'ath, the Quill freedom fighter who was indentured to him via an Arn in her brain. The two were rescued by the Twelfth Doctor and brought to Coal Hill Academy, where the prince took on the name "Charlie Smith" and Andra'ath the name "Miss Quill". On Earth, Miss Quill was able to remove the Arn in her brain with the aid of Ballon.

R

Raak 
The Raak was a sea monster experimented on by Crozier in Mindwarp. It was a mutated fish created to monitor tide wave technology. The part was played by Robert West under his original equity name of Russell West.

Racnoss 

The Racnoss appeared in 2006 Christmas special, "The Runaway Bride".

The Racnoss are described by the Tenth Doctor as an ancient race of aliens from the Dark Times of the universe. Half-humanoid, half-arachnid in appearance, they were an invasion force who consumed everything on the planets they conquered. Their race was wiped out by the Fledgling Empires, over 4.6 billion years ago. Although the Time Lords are not specified as being a part of the Empires, the Doctor acknowledges that his people unravelled their power source, Huon particles, and upon hearing the name of the Doctor's planet, Gallifrey, the Empress claims that they "murdered" the Racnoss. The Doctor and Donna Noble are shown witnessing nearly all of the survivors of the race escape in their ship to where the Earth would later form, serving in place of a planetesimal as its core, hibernating for billions of years, with the exception of their Empress. The Doctor notes that because the Huon particles ceased to exist, the surviving Racnoss are stuck in hibernation. The Empress is seen coming to Earth in her ship, the Webstar in this episode, seeking to use the Huon particles which had been recreated by the Torchwood Institute using the water of the River Thames as a means of reviving her "children" before feasting on the human population of Earth. The last Racnoss are presumed wiped out when the Doctor drains the waters of the Thames down the shaft leading to their ship; the Empress is killed when her own ship is destroyed by the British Army at the order of "Mr Saxon".

The Empress appears briefly in a flashback in "Turn Left" (2008). In the parallel universe created by Donna, she has still been defeated, but the Doctor, without Donna to stop him and ultimately save his life, is shown having drowned; a UNIT soldier speculates that he died "too fast for him to regenerate"; without his protection, the Earth is shown becoming a dystopia over the next few years.

The Racnoss also appear in the Doctor Who: Classic Doctors, New Monsters audio Empire of the Racnoss, which sees the Fifth Doctor being drawn into the war against the Racnoss in the distant past when a call for help during the war is picked up by a long-dormant program in the TARDIS, resulting in the Doctor being caught up in a political struggle between the Empress of the Racnoss and her traitorous old consort and her replacement consort.

Rakweed 

An alien plant from the planet Raxacoricofallapatorius, the Rakweed plant was presented to Sarah Jane Smith as a gift from the Blathereen family. However, the Rakweed quickly began releasing deadly spores into the atmosphere, which left its victims with an abnormal rash on their skin and in a coma. It later became apparent that the Blathereen were addicted to eating the Rakweed, which was highly sensitive to loud noises, and so when Mr Smith sounded a loud alarm across Ealing, the Rakweed shrivelled up and died, and ultimately meant that Blathereen exploded over Sarah Jane and her companions.

Raxacoricofallapatorian 

The Raxacoricofallapatorians first appeared in the Ninth Doctor episode "Aliens of London". They are native to Raxacoricofallapatorius and may be grouped by extended family names which are sometimes used to refer to their species generically. They hatch from eggs and are composed of living calcium. Capital punishment is practised on the homeworld, which involves immersion of convicted criminals in acid that slowly dissolves them while still alive, which spectators then drink as a soup.

The Slitheen family were a ruthless criminal sect motivated by profit. After being convicted for their crimes on Raxacoricofallapatorius, they were exiled and threatened with execution if they returned.

The Blathereen family were sworn enemies of the Slitheen and infiltrated the prison on the planet Justicia.

A Raxacoricofallapatorian appears in an alien bar in "The End of Time".

Reaper 

Reapers appeared in the Ninth Doctor episode "Father's Day", written by Paul Cornell. Although not named on screen, they were referred to as "Reapers" in the publicity material for the episode. The production team based their design on the Grim Reaper, with their tails shaped like scythes.

Reapers are multi-limbed, flying creatures similar to pterosaurs, with a large wingspan, sharp teeth both in the form of a beak and a secondary mouth in their torsos, coupled with a rapacious attitude. The Reapers are apparently extradimensional, materialising and dematerialising out of the spacetime vortex. They are attracted to temporal paradoxes that damage time, like bacteria swarming around a wound. They then proceed to "sterilise" the wound by consuming everyone in sight. The older the thing they devour the more it satisfies them.

Once in this dimension, however, they can be blocked by material barriers. The older the barriers, the more effective they are, but even the oldest of barriers cannot stop them forever. Paradoxes can also allow them to directly materialise at the spot of the paradox. If the timeline is restored, they vanish, with their actions reversed as if they had never happened.

In "Father's Day", the Doctor explained that when the Time Lords were still around, there were laws to prevent the spread of paradoxes and that such paradoxes could be repaired. This implies that the Reapers are a natural phenomenon whose manifestation could be prevented if the paradox was resolved quickly. However, with the elimination of the other Time Lords in the Last Great Time War, there was no longer any agency that could repair time.

Refusian

Rhodian 

The Rhodians were a humanoid species that ruled the planet Rhodia and had a long history of war with the Quill. All the Rhodians and the Quill were killed by the Shadow Kin, except the Prince of Rhodia and the Quill freedom fighter who was indentured to him. The two were rescued by the Twelfth Doctor and brought to Coal Hill Academy, where the prince took on the name "Charlie Smith" and Andra'ath the name "Miss Quill". Charlie managed to bring the Cabinet of Souls with him to Earth, a device that contained the souls of all the fallen Rhodians, which he later used to wipe out all the Shadow Kin when they invaded Earth.

Ribosian

Rill

Rutan 

An alien species in an endless war with the Sontarans, the Rutans appear as jellyfish-like glowing green spheres. Like the Zygons, Rutans can shapeshift at will. They are also vulnerable to certain sound frequencies.

S

Salakans 

Mentioned in Wally K. Daly's Doctor Who The Ultimate Evil story, a salesman named Dwarf Mordant was from a race known as the Salakans.

Sand Beast

Saturnyn 

Saturnyn are vampiric, lobster-like aliens that battled the Eleventh Doctor in 16th-century Venice in "The Vampires of Venice" (2010). Their appearance is quite obviously fear-inducing due to many sharp protrusions and fangs. They were able to breathe underwater and had vampire-like qualities such as a vulnerability to sunlight, no reflections and a thirst for human blood. However, these are easily explainable; as "fish from space", they are used to living in the dark depths; anyone's mind cannot deal with conflicting information of a perception filter and a Saturnyn's true reflection; Rosanna and Francesco drank the blood of the girls attending the school so they could replace it with their own. Their leader, Signora Rosanna Calvierri used a perception filter to appear as a human woman, who started a school for girls; it was a guise for seeking victims to be transformed into mates for Francesco's brothers. They planned to flood Venice in an attempt to continue their civilization since their own planet Saturnyne was destroyed by cracks in the universe. When the Doctor foiled their plan, Rosanna committed suicide by allowing her brood to devour her. However, when the Doctor rewrote time in "The Big Bang" (2010) by preventing the cracks' existence, it is highly likely Saturnyne was not destroyed by the cracks and the Calvierri family did not end.

The Doctor, at least in his eleventh incarnation, considered his adventure battling the Saturnyns to be memorable. In "A Good Man Goes to War" (2011), he said his adventures were "running about, sexy, fish vampires, and blowing up stuff", and even asked Melody Pond if Amy told her about the "Vampires in Venice" during "Let's Kill Hitler" (2011).

Savage

Scarecrow 

Straw-filled foot soldiers created by Son of Mine, using molecular fringe animation. They were relentless and untiring, with rudimentary intelligence. Even after being cut down by machine-gun fire, they could be reanimated. In a perfect sense of irony, Son of Mine was frozen in time and dressed up as a scarecrow, to watch over England's fields.

Another type of scarecrow which came alive were set to appear in the unmade movie Doctor Who Meets Scratchman, which was later novelised by Tom Baker.

Screamer

Sea Devil 

Sea Devils were turtle-like humanoids that lived in Earth's oceans millions of years before humans evolved. They believed that a small planet would crash into Earth, which instead became Earth's moon. Like the Silurians, they went into hibernation and wanted to take the planet back from humans when they awoke.

Seed Pod

Sensorite

Sex Gas 

An unnamed gaseous alien parasite that comes to Earth to feed on orgasmic energy in "Day One" (2006), claiming that there's no other energy in the universe like it; it's possible that orgasmic energy is like a drug to the gas, and that it's addicted. Composed of vorax and ceranium gases, Earth's atmosphere is poisonous to the alien, so it needs to take a human host to survive for prolonged periods; it doesn't show up on cameras. It vies for control with its host, causing physiological changes that will eventually cause the host's internal organs to explode.

The alien also makes its host secrete a blend of ultra-powerful pheromones that cause tremendous sexual attraction in those around it for the purposes of feeding; those with stronger wills might be able to resist the pheromones. Coupling with the host is fatal, causing the host's partner to disintegrate into a pile of dust at climax and allowing the alien to absorb the energy from the orgasm. It appeared to know human biology well (or at least just enough), knowing it needed the opposite gender in order to get the energy. It was tricked out of its host and left in a portable energy prison until it expired from being poisoned by the earth's air.

The BBC Torchwood website lists it as the "Sex gas". Producer Russell T Davies, in the documentary series Torchwood Declassified, refers to it as a "sex monster".

This creature served as a way of showing that Torchwood's stories could go places that Doctor Who's children-friendly stories could not.

The Shadow 

A member of an unknown race who served the Black Guardian. His face was blank, except for the vague impressions of the shape of a skull; he wore what seemed like dark ceremonial robes.

Shadow Kin 

The Shadow Kin were a race of fire-type humanoids from the Underneath. The Shadow Kin could exist as pure shadow and in a solid form, but could only survive physically with the presence of a shadow. They were ruled by the Shadow King, who ruled from the Shadow Palace on the Underneath. The Shadow Kin arrived on Rhodia in the midst of a civil war and killed all the Rhodians and Quills save the Rhodian prince Charlie Smith and his Quill protector Miss Quill, who were rescued by the Twelfth Doctor and brought to Coal Hill Academy. Following them to Earth, the Shadow Kin, led by Corakinus, emerged through a tear in space-time at the school's prom night but were forced back by the Doctor. During the invasion, when Coal Hill student April MacLean fired a displacement gun at Corakinus and Charlie pushed her out of the way, she and Corakinus began sharing April's heart. April found her way to the Shadow Palace and defeated Corakinus in battle. She became the new king, and had the Shadow Kin lock up Corakinus. However, they later returned to invade Earth again under Corakinus' command. Charlie decided to use a displacement gun to kill April and Corakinus, thus allowing Charlie to become the new Shadow King. As King, he ordered his army to retreat, and then he used the Cabinet of Souls to wipe all the Shadow Kin out of existence. After he used the cabinet, April resurrected but in Corakinus' body.

Shakri 

The Shakri are a species spoken of in Gallifreyan myths, said to be the "pest controllers of the universe"; Amy Pond found it a "strange choice for a bed-time story". They attack any species that they believe will pose a threat to the universe, hence why they tried eliminating humanity in the 21st century, years before they could colonise space in the future. A hologram of a wrinkled humanoid in a black robe was seen on the Shakri ship; however, it is not known if this is actually what the Shakri look like. The Shakri consider seven an important number, given they used that amount of portals, ships, cube activation time, and for a countdown. They follow something known as "the Tally"; the Doctor has implied that the Shakri compare a species' failures and successes to decide whether or not they will be subjected to "pest control".

Shalka 

The Shalka appear to be a serpentine alien race made of living rock and magma, but they are actually bioplasmic entities, living plasma, their physical appearance merely a "crust" concealing their true forms. They breathe volcanic air and prefer high temperatures, being most comfortable underground where lava meets metamorphic rock. They communicate through high-pitched screaming, which they can use for a variety of effects, like tunnelling through rock or mentally controlling other life forms. They also use sound as a part of their technology.

In an alternate timeline, the Shalka arrived on Earth via meteorite, initially landing near Mount Ruapehu, New Zealand, subsequently establishing a beachhead for their planned invasion of Earth beneath the Lancashire town of Lannet. They also created a stable wormhole for landing their invasion force, which could also be converted into a black hole to dispose of their enemies, as they tried to do with the Doctor.

As they claimed to have done to billions of planets before, they intended to implant Shalka larvae into key segments of the population, mind controlling them into emitting a scream that would destroy the ozone layer. In this way, the Shalka intended to raise the surface temperature of the planet to the point where the human race would perish but the Shalka could thrive. The Shalka would then live beneath the surface, with the rest of the universe believing that Earth's inhabitants had died of self-inflicted ecological damage. The Doctor defeated their plans with the help of the British military and a Lannet barmaid named Alison. They are not technically Doctor Who monsters since they appeared in a failed attempt to restart the series before it was permanently revived.

Shambonie 

An alien race said to have large foreheads.

Shansheeth 

The Shansheeth are a race of vulture-like aliens which appear in Death of the Doctor by Russell T Davies. The Claw Shansheeth of the Fifteenth Funeral Fleet announce to Sarah Jane Smith via UNIT the death of the Eleventh Doctor, and take charge of the funeral procession; Mr Smith confirms their status as the undertakers of the universe, finding fallen heroes on battlefields. However, the band of Shansheeth that Sarah Jane and Jo Jones (Katy Manning) encounter want to use the companions' memories of the Doctor, in conjunction with their Memory Weave device to create a TARDIS key with which they can steal the TARDIS and prevent death across the timeline. Sarah Jane and Jo, instead, overload the device, which blows up and destroys the Shansheeth along with their UNIT accomplice. The main branch of the Shansheeth later apologise to Sarah Jane for the actions of this rogue group.

Shrivenzale

"Simon" 
"Simon" was an alien mentioned on the Torchwood website, specifically in an article attached to, and especially in, Amanda Davies' diary. He was travelling on Earth, seeking to discover the source of life. He wandered into a countryside village and was taken in by the Davies family. Simon, having based his appearance on Jon Bon Jovi, near-instantly seduced the family's daughter – Amanda, and ultimately left her pregnant with an alien baby (which itself quickly developed, and began to degrade her health). Simon then disappeared around the same time as Jack Harkness arrived (implying he had been captured or killed by Torchwood), and later Jack met with Amanda's father and (apparently) made an agreement to have the entire village, including Amanda, subjected to amnesia pills, have all records and evidence that the Davies' existed in the village (including Amanda's diary) confiscated, have the alien baby removed before Amanda died, and then send the Davies family away with a new identity.

The Silence 

Self-proclaimed "Sentinels of History", the Silence are genetically engineered members of the Papal Mainframe under the Academy of the Question. As they were originally created as confessional priests, Silents cannot be remembered unless they are being looked at, or if someone is wearing an eyedrive. In "The Time of the Doctor" (2013), with The Doctor's enemies converging on Trenzalore, the Papal Mainframe underwent a faith conversion into the Church of the Silence whose main belief is that "Silence will fall" to keep the Doctor from answering the oldest question in the universe "Doctor Who?" to avert a war caused by the Time Lords' return. However, a group of Silents under a splinter chapel led by Madam Kovarian wanted to completely avoid the Siege of Trenzalore by eliminating the Doctor: their attempts range from destroying reality in Series 5, which caused the events at Trenzalore, and using Melody Pond in an attempt to murder the Doctor in Series 6. The Silents still loyal to the Papal Mainframe remain and joined forces with the Doctor to fight back all the villains converging on Trenzalore.

Silurian

Siren 

The Siren is a virtual doctor that was aboard a spaceship of an unknown alien race that crashed in a dimension parallel to the ocean the ship Fancy was sailing on in 1699. Thanks to "protein circuitry", she could appear before a species in a form that would be alluring to them for cooperation. To sedate her patients, the Siren could sing a beautiful vocal song. However, being nothing more than a program, the Siren had very little reasoning skills. The Siren turned red with demonic-looking face when faced with resistance and germs. When the ship she was doctor to crashed in a spatial rift where the Fancy had been becalmed (and the crew dead from a human disease), she impulsively started to take the injured of the ship, even if it was for a simple cut, showing a great lack of intelligence. Were it not for the Doctor's arrival, the Siren would eventually have reached shore and started trying to process anyone who was ill. Captain Henry Avery, Toby Avery and the crew of the Fancy took over the ship to give her someone to look after, and to see the universe.

Sirian 

A race of humanoids from the star Sirius.

Sisterhood of Karn 

A female religion in charge of the Elixir of Eternal Life. The Elixir has remarkable healing properties, such as aiding Time Lords undergoing difficult regenerations; the Fourth Doctor was given some after brain damage in a mental duel with Morbius. Other potions that the Sisterhood brew can allow Time Lords to choose what their next incarnation will be like; they range from age, weight, strength, emotion, sex and mindset. Seeing the person he had been for all his regenerations wasn't suited to combat the terror of the Time War, the Eighth Doctor choose a potion that would turn him into a Warrior.

Skarasen 

A creature brought to Earth by the Zygons that became the Loch Ness Monster.

Skithra

Skonnan

Skullion 

Skullions are short one-eyed extraterrestrials, originating from the planet Skultos. They are hydrophobic, meaning water will burn the Skullions in a torturous way. It is stated they can only drink citric juices.

In The Man Who Never Was (2011), a Skullion ship crashed into China where the aliens were sold at a black market to Mr Harrison, who uses them as slaves, attaching collars to their necks as torturing devices. Sarah Jane Smith and her friends were able to save them though, contacting their home planet. A rescue ship arrives, beaming up the Skullions and Mr Harrison, who refused to let them escape. The Skullions were credited by Gareth Roberts.

Sky Fish 

The Sky Fish are fish-like creature capable of swimming through the air using the electricity of the planet Ember's crystalline fog. They are attracted to music as it causes the crystals in the fog to resonate in a way that produces delta waves. They vary from small fish to fully grown sharks.

Slitheen 

The Slitheen are a family of massive, bipedal extraterrestrials. They are creatures of living calcium, hatched from eggs and native to the planet Raxacoricofallapatorius. While, strictly speaking, the name "Slitheen" refers to a specific family, the term has been used by the Doctor to refer to the Raxacoricofallapatorian race in general.

The Slitheen are able to wear a human's skin as a disguise, using a compression field to shrink themselves. As they are mostly made of calcium, they are vulnerable to acetic acid (vinegar).

The Slitheen have appeared in the Doctor Who episodes "Aliens of London", "World War Three" and "Boom Town" and the interactive episode, "Attack of the Graske" (all 2005). "From Raxacoricofallapatorius with Love", a mini episode of The Sarah Jane Adventures for Comic Relief, featured Ronnie Corbett as a small Slitheen. They have also appeared in The Sarah Jane Adventures episodes Revenge of the Slitheen and The Lost Boy.

The Slitheen are mentioned as being part of The Alliance formed to trap the Doctor in "The Pandorica Opens" (2010).

Slyther 
The Slyther was a monster that served the Daleks. It was seen in episodes four and five of The Dalek Invasion of Earth (1964), guarding the Dalek mines in Bedfordshire. After the Slyther attacked a small group of humans, killing Ashton, Ian hit it with a rock, causing it to fall down a pit to its death.

Solonian 

The Solonians are a race of humanoid creatures from the planet Solos, colonized by the Overlords. The atmosphere contains a nitrogen isotope which causes the air to become toxic to humans in sunlight, although it has no effect on Solonians. Because Solos' environment changes drastically every 500 years, they must undergo major mutations periodically in order to survive.

Sontaran 

A Sontaran first appeared as the antagonist in the Third Doctor serial The Time Warrior (1973–74). The Sontarans were referred to in Eye of the Gorgon by Bea who said they looked like a huge potato with a raygun. Commander Kaagh appears in Series 2 in the story The Last Sontaran after the destruction of his battle fleet as well as the death of the other Sontarans on board in the Doctor Who two-parter episodes "The Sontaran Strategem" and "The Poison Sky" (2008). He returns in Enemy of the Bane, where he sides up with Mrs Wormwood, the recurring Bane. In the end, he sacrifices himself to foil her plans of the destruction of Earth. He makes a small appearance in "The Pandorica Opens" (2010). The Sontarans remain slightly miffed that they weren't allowed to fight in the Time War.

As seen with Strax, Sontarans can't tell the difference between men and women ("Two genders is a bit further than [they] can count"), and think polite terms such as Miss or Mister are military ranks.

Spiridon 
The Spiridons featured in the serial Planet of the Daleks (1973). They are the dominant species of sentient humanoids on planet Spiridon in the Ninth System. They have developed a form of invisibility, capable of generating "anti-reflecting light waves". They become visible after death, having pale skin and a gaunt appearance. They wear heavy purple fur cloaks at night to protect themselves from the harsh nights of Spiridon. The Doctor returns to Spiridon in spin-off audio adventures Return of the Daleks and Brotherhood of the Daleks.

Star Whale 

The Star Whale is a giant whale-like creature, presumed to be the last of its kind, used to pilot the Starship UK, so as to save its citizens from the dangerous solar flares. The whale has the features of other animals such as an anglerfish's angler, an octopus's tentacles and a scorpion's tail, as well as having a bright pink hide with bioluminescent patches. It arrived on Earth as it heard the children of the United Kingdom crying, and was unable to bear the sound. Believing its arrival to be a one-in-a-million miracle, the people of Britain captured it and built their ship around it, torturing it via powerful electric pulses, administered directly into the opened pain center of the Whale's brain, in order to keep the ship flying. Over the years, they realised that they could not justify keeping the creature in agony, but feared that if they set it free, the ship and all those aboard would be destroyed as the creature fled, so they chose to instead forget, and fed those who protested to the beast. When the Doctor learnt of this, he decided to render the creature brain-dead, ending its suffering and saving the lives of all those on the ship, but Amy set it free, revealing that the whale had volunteered to help, and that contrary to the beliefs of the station's masters, that it would continue flying without the need to torture it. The creature's exact size is not specified, and it is only visible in its entirety towards the episode's ending.

Stenza 

The Stenza are a warrior race who possess sub-zero body temperatures. As physical contact with any part of them can cause death from sub-zero burns, Stenza require the use of specialised suits to be able to interact safely with other lifeforms. The Stenza maintain two traditions amongst their people – a ritualistic hunt to earn the right of leadership, in which a Stenza hunts a randomly selected quarry without the use of weapons or any form of aid; and collecting a tooth from a kill to later apply to their face. The Stenza are noted for conducting ethnic cleansing on planets they conquer, as revealed in "The Ghost Monument", using the conquered populace to create weapons for their use.

Stigorax 

A species that appears similar to large, furry rats; they are carnivorous. The last of the Stigorax was adopted by Helen A, who named it Fifi and took care of it. Fifi was released into sewer pipes to chase and devour escaping criminals. Fifi was later fatally wounded by a collapsing pipe, managing to climb out just in time for Helen A to find it. Fifi's death showed Helen A that sadness could not be prevented.

Swampie 

Green-skinned, green-haired natives of the third moon of Delta Magma. Other than their colour, they appear similar to humans. Swampies are intelligent but primitive, lacking technology. They worship a giant squid-like creature called Kroll. Throughout The Power of Kroll, only male Swampies are seen.

The Swarm 

Also known by the Unified Intelligence-Taskforce (UNIT) as Stingrays, they are flying manta ray-like creatures, with metal exoskeletons that allow them to travel from planet to planet via wormholes. They consume everything on a planet, turning it into desert; and then swarm over the planet's surface, generating a wormhole which allows them to travel to the next planet.

The Stingrays are apparently arthropods, as they are exothermic, and possess an exoskeleton composed of metal that has been ingested then exuded to the exoskeleton. They are voracious feeders, eating both organic and inorganic materials ranging from flesh and bone to plant matter to metals and plastic. They also produce vast numbers of young and grow from birth to adult in under a year, as shown when the Tenth Doctor shows a year-old clip of San Helios before its Stingray infestation.

They travel to other planets through wormholes created in the fabric of Spacetime by circling a planet faster and faster, and as each swarm can contain billions of giant stingrays, they rip a hole in space. Their wormholes can transport the whole swarm an infinite distance through space.

Sycorax 

The Sycorax first appeared in the debut Tenth Doctor story "The Christmas Invasion" in 2005.
The Sycorax appear to be skinless humanoids wearing mantles of bone, usually keeping their features concealed under helmets. They are proficient in the use of weapons like swords and whips, the latter which can deliver an energy discharge that disintegrates the flesh of its target. Their language is called Sycoraxic. The Sycorax also appear to have technology that is either disguised or treated as magic, referring to "curses" and the Doctor's regenerative abilities as "witchcraft". The Sycorax leader referred to an "armada" that they could use to take Earth by force if their blood control plan failed. They also appear to have a martial society, with traditions of honourable combat, yet they have no qualms about killing prisoners.

According to a write-up by Russell T Davies on the BBC website, the Sycorax facial structure was inspired by the skull of a horse. According to the same write-up, the Sycorax originated on an asteroid in the distant JX82 system, known as the Fire Trap. They were uplifted when a spaceship crashed on their asteroid and the Sycorax Leader enslaved the survivors, forcing the aliens to teach them about their technology. The asteroid was then retrofitted into the first of many spaceships, which the Sycorax then used to raid other planets, becoming feared interstellar scavengers. This reputation is made clear in their attitude to other 'inferior' races. The Sycorax leader comments to Rose that he would not 'dirty his tongue' with her language, and their translated word for 'human' can also be taken to mean 'cattle'. Their armada is permanently in orbit around the Jewel of Staa Crafell.

In The Doctor Who Files books, the name of the Sycorax homeworld is given as "Sycorax". It is unclear if this is another name for the Fire Trap. Furthermore, after the destruction of the Fire Trap, the Sycorax spread further through the galaxy, and like humans are one of three species that continually survive and adapt, even unto the End of the Universe.

The name Sycorax is used in William Shakespeare's play The Tempest. Shakespeare's Sycorax has died before the play begins; she is described as a witch who was the mother of the beast Caliban. The Shakespearean name is referenced in the third series episode "The Shakespeare Code" when the Doctor finds a horse's skull in The Globe's prop cupboard. He comments that it "Reminds [him] too much of the Sycorax". Shakespeare remarks he likes the sound of the word, obviously then going on to use it in The Tempest.

The Sycorax also make a brief appearance in "The Pandorica Opens" (2010) as part of The Alliance formed to trap the Doctor.  Later, in "The Name of the Doctor" (2013), the Great Intelligence mentions them as one of those that left the Doctor blood-soaked. A Sycorax appears as a prisoner alongside the Doctor in "Revolution of the Daleks" (2021).

In issue #1 of the IDW published Doctor Who comic book, a Sycorax is collecting near-extinct species to use with shape-shifters for expensive hunts. The Sycorax race also make a return in the Tenth Doctor comic strip "The Widow's Curse", in Doctor Who Magazine #395. The DWM comic story is the first appearance of female Sycorax, who seem to operate separately from the males.

In the audio series Classic Doctors, New Monsters, the Seventh Doctor faces the Sycorax in the audio "Harvest of the Sycorax", where he has to stop their efforts to take control of a space station that contains blood samples taken from virtually the entire human race of the far future.

T

Tree of Cheem

The Tancreds

Taran

Taran Beast

Tenza 

The Tenza are an alien species that has their young raised by other species. Put simply, "a Tenza's sole function is to fit in." They adapt perfectly to what their foster parents want, such as "George" becoming the son Claire was unable to give birth to. Tenzas have powerful psychic abilities such being able to create monsters with just their imagination, as well as mentally creating massive perception filters that alter their foster parents' memories. Since George didn't seem aware of his nature as a Tenza, the young of his species must do these things subconsciously or simply forget their true identities to blend in perfectly. The Doctor has said that Tenza puberty is "always a funny time", and said he might be back to deal with George again if something else goes awry.

Terileptil 

The Terileptils appeared in the Fifth Doctor serial The Visitation by Eric Saward. They are a reptilian humanoid species, they cannot survive long without breathing soliton gas, which is highly combustible when combined with oxygen. As an advanced society, they enjoy a heightened appreciation of both aesthetics and warfare, and have been known to employ bejewelled androids. Criminal punishment in Terileptil society includes life imprisonment working in tinclavic mines on the planet Raaga, often with sub-standard medical care.

In 1666, a group of Terileptil prison escapees hidden near London attempted to use a genetically enhanced version of the Black Plague to destroy humanity. The destruction of their lab in Pudding Lane caused the Great Fire of London.

The Terileptils destroyed the Sonic screwdriver which did not appear again until the Doctor Who TV movie.

The Terileptils are mentioned as being part of The Alliance formed to trap the Doctor in "The Pandorica Opens" (2010).  They were also present during the siege of Trenzalore. A Terileptil is briefly shown as one of the criminals displayed by Psi in "Time Heist" (2014).

According to the Virgin Missing Adventures novel The Dark Path by David A. McIntee, by the 34th century, their homeworld Terileptus is a member of the Galactic Federation, and a noted builder of starships. A Terileptil also appears as the chief engineer on a Federation starship. The planet is destroyed during the events described in the novel.

Terraberserker 

A race that lives in the Kondonian Belt, but is very few in number. The Eleventh Doctor knows their language and customs well, exchanging a greeting with one at the Festival of Offerings.

Terradonian

Tetrap 

The Tetraps are a bat-like race from the planet Tetrapyriarbus. A pack of Tetraps was employed by the Rani to help defend her Giant Brain in the Seventh Doctor's debut story, Time and the Rani (1987) by Pip and Jane Baker. The Rani armed a pack of Tetraps for this purpose and used them as general henchmen to terrorise the native Lakertyans.

Tetraps have four eyes, one on each side of their head, giving them all-round vision, and put this to good use in stalking fugitives. Like bats, they sleep by hanging upside-down in a cavern. They feed off a dark red-coloured sludge that the Lakertyan leader releases down a chute into a trough.

Tetraps possess limited intelligence, but they soon realise that the Rani's plans would have them all killed on Lakertya. This is confirmed when their leader, Urak, hears of her plans and she later leaves him to guard over her laboratory rather than take him with her in her TARDIS, thus condemning him to death. Urak and the enraged Tetraps capture the Rani in her ship and take her back to their home planet, to force her to help solve their natural resource shortages.

Thal 

The Thals are a race of peaceful, blond humanoids who, together with the Daleks, are natives of the planet Skaro. Once a warlike species, a nuclear conflict with the Daleks, which nearly wiped out all life on their home planet, led them to develop a pacifist, agrarian society.

Tharil 

The Tharil are a humanoid race of lion like creatures. Hailing from E-Space their world is connected to The Gate between E-space and N-space. The are time sensitive and are able to use their powers to traverse the universe and enslave many people. However their empire crumbled when the slaves built robots, looking like armoured knights, rebelled. The tables were turned and the Tharil became the slaves, forcefully used to navigate time. One Tharil brings the Fourth Doctor and his companions to the gate. When the Doctor learns of their history he agrees they have suffered enough for their crimes and helps free the ones on the slavers ship. As the Doctor and Adric leave, Romana II and K9 mk 2 remain behind to help the Tharils free the enslaved on other planets.

Thoros Alphan

Tigellan

Time Beetle 

The Time Beetle is a member of the Trickster's Brigade, a group of aliens that serve the Trickster. The Time Beetle, similar to the Trickster himself, feeds on time energy and can cause a victim to change a decision they made in the past, thereby altering history. The change in history is usually very minor, affecting only the person the beetle attaches to, and the universe usually "compensates" for the discrepancy.

When the beetle attaches to Donna in "Turn Left" (2008), instead of compensating it creates a "great big parallel world" where Donna never meets the Doctor, resulting in disaster for Earth. The Doctor, Martha Jones, Sarah Jane Smith, and Torchwood staff Ianto Jones and Gwen Cooper were all killed, the city of London was completely destroyed when the Titanic crashes into Buckingham Palace, Captain Jack Harkness is taken to the Sontaran homeworld, and millions of people die from threats the Doctor would have otherwise prevented. Donna travels back in time to make her make the original decision that leads to her meeting the Doctor, killing the Beetle. According to both the Doctor and Donna, this universe ceased to exist.

In an accompanying "Monster Files" episode, Captain Jack raised doubts over whether the whole of the Trickster's Brigade consists of beetles, suggesting all individuals are of different species.

In the Torchwood episode "Immortal Sins" (2011), the Trickster's Brigade is mentioned as they attempt to cause the victory of Nazi Germany by assassinating Franklin Delano Roosevelt through a parasite.

Time Brain 

A creation of the Rani's by pooling the intelligence of all the most brilliant minds of history together. She sought to find the light-weight counterpart to Strange Matter, in order to capture a large amount of it.

Time Lord 

The Time Lords are a race of humanoid aliens to which the Doctor, among other characters, belongs. Time Lords have the ability to regenerate when mortally wounded. This process creates for them an entirely new body and results in major changes in personality, but retains the Time Lord's memories and identity. It is suggested in The Power of the Daleks (1966) that some detectable feature is retained, as the Daleks are immediately able to recognize the Second Doctor, even though he has just regenerated. During "The Time of the Doctor" (2013), it was confirmed by the Eleventh Doctor that a Time-Lord, naturally, is only allowed 12 regenerations, resulting in 13 different incarnations. In the same episode, the Doctor saves Clara's life by sending her home to her own time, but in protest she clings to the TARDIS through the Time Vortex on its return. Upon arriving 300 years later, she finds a visibly aged Doctor, proving that Time Lords experience natural physical changes during each lifespan between regenerations. In the episode "A Good Man Goes to War" (2011), it is suggested this ability evolved due to the Time Lord race's long-term exposure to the untempered schism.

Time Lords exhibit various other superhuman abilities, including certain mental powers, and resistance to otherwise harmful effects such as extreme cold and radiation. They possess a binary vascular system (two hearts), and therefore a faster heart rate, as well as a cooler internal body temperature. The Doctor would later claim that Time Lords came before humans did in "The Beast Below" (2010).

The first Time Lord to appear other than the Doctor and his granddaughter Susan Foreman is the Monk, in the 1965 serial The Time Meddler, however his race is nor confirmed. The term itself is not used until The War Games (1969), when the race as a whole is introduced.

As of the 2005 revival series, the Time Lords are essentially extinct, apart from the Doctor, as they have been destroyed by him during the Time War. However, "The Day of the Doctor" (2013) shows that this was a ruse; the Time Lords are still alive in pocket universe, where all of the Doctors put them to save them from destruction.

Time Zombies 
Creatures that appeared in "Journey to the Centre of the TARDIS" (2013). They are echoes of the possible future selves that the Doctor, Clara, Trickey and Gregor would have become from being exposed to the Eye of Harmony too long; they were burnt by it as their cells liquified. It appeared that they lacked most of their former intelligence, along with the ability to speak. However, each may have been driven by a particular motive – the Doctor wanted the part of the Arch Rec back from Gregor, Clara could have wanted revenge on the Van Baalens for being the cause of all the trouble, and Gregor and Tricky would want revenge for being mutated into a monster. Each could be identitified, although not as easily with the Doctor and Clara, because of how they changed; the Doctor is stuck holding his head, and the Van Baalens are stuck to each other.

Unlike the other time echoes, they could touch the present world, and killed Bram Van Baalen. They end up trapping their past selves in the Eye of Harmony's room by accident, setting up the existence of the Time Zombies. The Doctor realised how to avert the future, killing all but Clara's echo by knocking them off the rail. However, the Van Baalens couldn't avoid their fate. The Doctor eventually prevented the existence of these things by resetting time, preventing the TARDIS from being damaged and salvaged by the Van Baalen Brothers.

Tivolian 

The Tivolians are a cowardly rodent-faced race that live on Tivoli, the most invaded planet in the galaxy. As a result, they have designed their cities to be comfortable for invading armies and their national anthem is "Glory To <Insert Name Here>". They are known for surrendering as soon as possible, and actually enjoy being conquered. As a result of the natives' cowardly attitudes, the planet Tivoli has lasted longer than any of the greater civilizations. They do not assert their own opinions often, just wishing to be ordered around or enslaved, as seen in the case of Gibbis and Albar Prentis. The Twelfth Doctor says that Tivolians wouldn't say "Boo" to a goose—they'd be more likely to give the goose their car keys and bank account information. Among the list of those who ruled the Tivolians are the Fisher King and the "glorious Arcateenians”.

Toclafane 

The Toclafane are the last remnants of humanity from the year 100 trillion. Originally intending to travel to Utopia, the last refuge of a dying universe, they find nothing but "the dark and the cold" of space. Losing the last shred of hope they had, they turned on themselves, cannibalising their own bodies to create a new cyborg race. As part of this process they regress into little more than children with shared memories. The name Toclafane is given to them by The Master, who takes it from the Gallifreyan equivalent of the bogeyman.

The Toclafane's cyborg forms possess energy devices capable of killing and disintegrating targets. They are equipped with numerous retractable blades. The first four to be seen also exhibit apparent teleportation or cloaking abilities, not displayed by others of their race. All that remains of their bodies are barely recognisable human faces wired into basketball-sized mechanical spheres.

In "The Sound of Drums" and "Last of the Time Lords" (2007), the Master rescues four Toclafane from the end of the universe prior to an eventual Big Freeze, using them to fake a first contact situation in order to draw the world's leaders into one place for easy capture. He then uses a "paradox machine" to allow the future of the human race to slaughter many in the present, in short bringing the six billion humans that are alive in the year 100 trillion to return in the form of the Toclafane. The paradox machine creates a temporal paradox, allowing them to kill their ancestors without damaging themselves, and thus establish the Master's rule over Earth. After subduing Earth, the Master aims to establish a new Time Lord empire with himself as the leader and the Toclafane as his people and ground troops. This plan is foiled when the paradox machine is destroyed, causing time to rewind and trapping the Toclafane back at the end of the universe. Once the Master loses control of Earth, the false name Tocalafane is discarded for a more generic "spheres".

The Toclafane feature on the cover of the New Series Adventures novel, The Story of Martha, which chronicles Martha Jones's adventures during The Year That Never Was.

Torajii 
A sentient star featured in the episode "42". The crew of a cargo ship uses a sun scoop on Torajii to refuel their ship, unaware that it is actually a living organism. Torajii then uses the stolen matter to possess and kill the crew until the fuel is returned. Once the sun scoop is dumped, it allows the ship to fly away.

Tractator

Trakenite 

A humanoid species, with great intelligence, that live on the peaceful planet of Traken, which is part of the Traken Union. A Keeper is chosen to guard the Source once the life of the current one draws close to ending. Their planet would petrify anything evil that would arrive, until the Keeper's life began waning and thus the petrification would weaken. During Logopolis (1981), the Master caused the destruction of the Traken Union and its people by unleashing entropy back into the universe, leaving Nyssa (as far as she or anyone knew) the sole Trakenite in existence.

Travist Polong 
Travist Polong is an orange, metre-long, five-eyed slug/slater-like alien. Sarah Jane Smith attempted to catch it at a hospital at Tarminster in The Mark of the Berserker (2008), but left to deal with a Berserker.

Travist Polong was later delivered to Sarah Jane in The Wedding of Sarah Jane Smith (2009) after she saw it on eBay in its dormant stage. Rani Chandra and Clyde Langer took it inside Rani's house, but it escaped. They chased it to 13 Bannerman Road, where they caught it in a garbage can. Sarah Jane directed Rani to order Mr Smith to teleport it to Polongus, its home planet. Sarah Jane described Travist Polong as "not evil, just trouble".

The Trickster 
The Trickster is a being beyond the universe which seeks to manifest itself through causing chaos. It can interfere in deaths, by making deceptive deals to prolong life at a price. It can only exist within the universe for brief periods, without physical form, sometimes in a mirror or other reflective surface. It is a member of the Pantheon of Discord. Played by Paul Marc Davis, the Trickster is a recurring nemesis in The Sarah Jane Adventures. Though the character does not directly appear in the series's related programmes (parent show Doctor Who and adult sister show Torchwood), the Trickster's attempts to change history have nevertheless been depicted.

In Whatever Happened to Sarah Jane?, in order to create chaos of sufficient magnitude, the Trickster removed Sarah Jane Smith from history so that an asteroid that only she could have stopped would hit the Earth. The Trickster altered an incident in Sarah Jane's childhood in 1964 that originally led to the death of her best friend, Andrea Yates. The Trickster switched the places of the two girls after gaining Andrea's consent, creating a timeline in which Sarah Jane died at age 13. Preferring a meaningless destruction of Earth rather than for profit or military conquest, the Trickster also influenced the various alien threats Sarah Jane had faced on Earth to simply stay-away from the planet, creating a peaceful timeline up until the impending asteroid strike. Keeping Sarah Jane in Limbo, it further planned to use her to find and remove The Doctor from history, which would create a timeline of diabolical chaos, wherein the many tragedies the Doctor averted would have instead proceeded.

The Time Beetle that consumes time energy by changing an individual's personal timeline in the Doctor Who episode "Turn Left" is described in the episode as one of "the Trickster's Brigade".

In The Temptation of Sarah Jane Smith, the Trickster returned with the Graske. It manifested in 1951 after Sarah Jane saved her parents' lives. By 2008 it had completely devastated the planet and enslaved the human population, and was working on conquering other planets. Sarah Jane returned to the point of his manifestation in an attempt to stop him, but could not think of a suitable method. Her parents willingly drive off in their car, leading to their death, causing the Trickster to vanish and the original time to be restored. The Trickster materialised through the Abbot's Gate at the old monastery in Sarah Jane's home village of Foxgrove. This entry point was razed for the construction of an A road in 1964.

The Trickster returned in The Wedding of Sarah Jane Smith, having made a deal with lawyer Peter Dalton after an accident at home, granting Dalton his life and the love he never had, Sarah Jane. Sarah Jane fell in love with Dalton, and agreed to marry him, but the wedding was interrupted by the arrival of the Tenth Doctor. The Trickster took the hotel out of time, trapping Sarah Jane and Peter in one second while the Doctor, Luke, Clyde, Rani and K9 were trapped in another. Realising that the Trickster intended for Sarah's marriage to end her life of defending the Earth, Sarah Jane convinced Peter that he must break the deal, sacrificing himself so that Sarah Jane could continue to save the world. The Trickster made reference to the Tenth Doctor's upcoming future regeneration and added that the Doctor's first meeting with the Pantheon of Discord had sent ripples back through time. The Trickster was revealed to be vulnerable to artron energy (the power source of the TARDIS). Clyde became charged with artron energy when he came in contact with the TARDIS while it was attempting to penetrate the Trickster's time rift. He was able to use the energy to harm the Trickster, draining its energy long enough for the Doctor to penetrate the Trickster's temporal trap.

The Trickster is briefly referenced in the Torchwood: Miracle Day episode "Immortal Sins". In the episode, Captain Jack Harkness and his lover/companion Angelo Colasanto intercept and destroy an alien parasite that the Trickster's brigade had planned to use to infect U.S. President Franklin D. Roosevelt and create an alternate timeline where Nazi Germany won World War II.

A shot of the Trickster is briefly shown in the 2014 Doctor Who episode "Time Heist", describing him as one of many of the galaxy's most notorious criminals. Considering he desires nothing but chaos, the Trickster is likely the most wanted criminal.

The Trickster's Brigade 
The Trickster's Brigade serve the recurring The Sarah Jane Adventures villain, The Trickster. They also feed on chaos in time as the Trickster does. In "Turn Left", a Time Beetle, a member of The Trickster's Brigade, attaches itself onto the back of companion Donna Noble, creating a parallel world where she never met the Doctor in "The Runaway Bride", leading to his death.

In the Torchwood episode "Immortal Sins", Captain Jack Harkness and Angelo Colasanto discover that The Trickster's Brigade plans to cause the victory of Nazi Germany by assassinating Franklin Delano Roosevelt with the use of a brain parasite but Jack shoots it in the head, killing it instantly.

Trion 

A humanoid species, with no visible differences from humans, Trions are quite intelligent. A civil war broke out on the planet, and those on the wrong side were banished to different planets, Turlough ended up on Earth, while the rest of his family ended up on a volcanic planet. The descendants of the original exiles came to believe the mark of exile meant those who had it were chosen by their god, Mulkur, to lead them. After several years past, the exile was lifted from those banished from the planet, allowing them back home.

Tritovore 

Humanoid fly creatures, they trade with other civilisations for their excrement. They communicate with clicks that the TARDIS did not translate because it was not on the same planet as the Tenth Doctor and Lady Christina de Souza. The Doctor speaks with them through their own language while they understand The Doctor through a one-way telepathic translating communication device.

Tythonian

U

Ultramancer

Urbankan

Usurian 

The Usurians from the planet Usurius are a species that abandoned military conquest in favour of economic conquest. They enslaved humanity after their engineers made Mars suitable for human habitation, humans having depleted the Earth's resources. Once humanity had depleted Mars's resources as well, the Usurians engineered Pluto so that humans could inhabit it. They created six artificial "Suns" around it and installed the Collector to oversee the collection of taxes from their human workforce. They intended to abandon Pluto and leave humanity to become extinct once the humans had exhausted its resources, there being no economically viable planet to relocate humanity to once more. The humans on Pluto revolted against the Collector and seized control of Pluto. The revolutionaries intended to relocate to Earth as the Doctor assured them it would have regenerated in their absence.

The Usurians have knowledge of the Time Lords, graded as "Grade 3" in their "latest market survey", considering Gallifrey to be of low commercial value. Usurians can adopt a humanoid form but in their natural state they resemble seaweed. Shock can force them to revert to their natural form. According to the Doctor, Usurians are listed in a "flora and fauna" of the universe written by a Professor Thripthead under poisonous fungi.

Uvodni 
The Uvodni is a bug-like race, first introduced in Warriors of Kudlak (2007). General Kudlak served in his race's military until injuries forced him to retire. In order to gain more troops for his race's continuing war effort, Kudlak was dispatched to Earth. He seized control of the Combat 3000 laser game franchise, which he secretly used to find human children with strong combat skills. These children were teleported to Kudlak's orbiting spaceship and dispatched to fight in his race's war. Kudlak took orders from a battle computer that used the image of a female of his race as an avatar, which he referred to as "Mistress". An error left the computer unable to comprehend the concept of the war ending, so it withheld from Kudlak an announcement of peace from his emperor for over a decade. When this fact was revealed, by intervention of Luke Smith's computer hacking, Kudlak destroyed the computer. He then dedicated his life to finding and returning the already dispatched human children, hoping to gain inner peace by doing so.

An Uvodni appeared in "The Pandorica Opens" (2010) as part of the Alliance formed to trap the Doctor.

The Uvodni are mentioned in the audiobook The White Wolf, when Ben remarks that the Uvodni could have helped them get home.

The Uvodni are mentioned in the audiobook Wraith World, when Clyde Langer remarks he cannot understand why Luke and Rani would want to read about made up adventures, when they have faced Uvodni.

Uxariean

V

Validium 

Living metal created by the Time Lords, capable of many tasks due to its origins. Such metal ended up on Earth and Lady Peinforte used it to make a statue of herself, the Nemesis Statue. The Doctor, through his various incarnations, sent the statue off Earth every 25 years, only for it to return, due to the bow and arrow being missing and thus draw the statue back; every great disaster in Earth's history that's 25 years apart was caused by it.

In 1988, the Doctor was able to recover all the pieces and have the statue explode in the middle of a Cyberman fleet.

Vampire 
A number of different types of vampire have appeared in televised Doctor Who:

 In the fourth episode of the 1965 First Doctor serial The Chase, the First Doctor, Ian, Barbara and Vicki encounter Count Dracula and Frankenstein's Monster, who make short work of a pursuing party of Daleks. The Doctor speculates that the monsters and the haunted mansion that they inhabit are the products of nightmares created from the human psyche. As the TARDIS and the Daleks' time capsule leave, it is revealed that the monsters are in fact funfair robots.
 The Fourth Doctor encounters vampires whilst travelling in E-Space in the 1980 serial State of Decay. The Doctor, Romana, Adric and K9 encounter three vampires, Aukon, Camilla and Zargo. It is revealed that the three are servants of the giant King Vampire who once fought a great war against the Time Lords but was the sole survivor of the war by escaping to E-Space. The Doctor defeats the King Vampire by launching the lesser vampires' tower—actually the command module of the ship piloted by the originally human trio – and using it as a stake to pierce the giant vampire's heart. The three servant vampires perish along with their king.
 Creatures similar to vampires, Saturnyns, appeared in the Eleventh Doctor episode "The Vampires of Venice", and another species known for drinking blood, the Plasmavore, was shown in "Smith and Jones".

Vampires have also appeared in Doctor Who stories in other media. Vampires related to the Great Vampires seen in State of Decay are featured prominently in the Virgin New Adventures novel Blood Harvest, the Missing Adventure Goth Opera, the BBC Eighth Doctor Adventures novel Vampire Science, and the Big Finish Productions audio dramas Project: Twilight and Project: Lazarus. The Eighth Doctor Adventure The Eight Doctors also features them in a flashback to State of Decay; in addition, the war between the vampires and the Time Lords is a significant plot element in the New Adventure Damaged Goods. Other vampires or vampire-like creatures have been featured in the Missing Adventure Managra, the audio drama UNIT: Snake Head, the BBCi webcast Death Comes to Time, the short story The Feast of the Stone (featuring an alternate Ninth Doctor), the Bernice Summerfield anthology The Vampire Curse, and the Torchwood website.

Vampires also featured in the Big Finish Doctor Who 40th anniversary story Zagreus. Here an account is given that the Vampires originally fed on mindless creatures they bred themselves, until the Time Lords attacking them forced them to feed on sentient species. It is also claimed here that Rassilon developed regeneration from the Vampires.

Vanir

Vardan

Varga Plant 

The Varga Plants (sometimes Vaarga) appeared in the First Doctor episode "Mission to the Unknown" and the serial The Daleks' Master Plan (1965–66), which were essentially a prologue and main epic respectively. They were created by Terry Nation.

Varga Plants grew naturally on the Daleks' homeworld, Skaro, and when the Daleks set up a base on the planet Kembel they brought some Varga plants with them to act as sentries in the jungle surrounding their base. They were suited to this as they could move around freely by dragging themselves along with their roots.

Varga plants resemble cacti; they are covered in fur and thorns. Anyone pricked by a Varga thorn will be consumed by the urge to kill, while simultaneously becoming a Varga plant themself. This grisly fate befell astronauts Jeff Garvey and Gordon Lowery, and their commander, Marc Cory, was forced to kill them.

The plants later made an appearance in the Big Finish audio I, Davros: Purity. In this, it was revealed that the Varga plants were one of the oldest species on Skaro, but for most of their history had been immobile. Since the start of the Kaled-Thal war however, exposure to radiation and chemical weapons had caused them to rapidly evolve into a much deadlier form, capable of self-locomotion. It was this discovery that caused Davros to become interested in genetically engineering creatures in order to create weapons of war. In Dalek Empire II: Dalek War, they were found on a terraformed Jupiter where they infected earth troops. They appeared in City of the Daleks where after the Time War they infested the ruined Dalek city of Kaalann on Skaro but here their appearance was much different.

Varosian 

Varosians are the descendants of prisoners that were kept on the planet, though the truth of this has faded with time, with only a few knowing the truth.

Vashta Nerada 

Vashta Nerada (literally: the shadows that melt the flesh) are microscopic swarm creatures which, when present in a high enough concentration, are indistinguishable from shadows, and use this to their advantage in approaching and attacking prey. They are described as the "piranhas of the air", able to strip their victims to the bone in an instant in high enough densities. The Tenth Doctor says that almost every planet in the universe has some, including Earth, and claims that they can be seen as the specks of dust visible in bright light. He states they are the reason most sentient creatures have an instinctual fear of the dark. On most planets, however, Vashta Nerada exist in relatively low concentrations, feeding primarily on carrion, with attacks on people being comparatively rare. In the episode "Silence in the Library", an unusually high concentration of Vashta Nerada had completely overrun the 51st-century "Library", resulting in the apparent death of everyone inside at the time.

Vashta Nerada normally live in forested areas, and reproduce by means of microscopic spores which can lie dormant in wood pulp. In the episode "Forest of the Dead", this is revealed to be the reason for their unusual prevalence in The Library, as it is made known that the books and The Library itself was constructed of wood from the Vashta Nerada's native forest feeding grounds. Individually, Vashta Nerada are non-sentient, but if a large enough concentration come together, they can form a group mind of human-level intelligence capable of communication.

The fourth episode of Doctor Who: The Adventure Games, "Shadows of the Vashta Nerada", features them as the leading villain when a temporal rift draws a swam of Vashta Nerada to an underwater base that is being visited by the Eleventh Doctor and Amy Pond.

The Vashta Nerada appear in the second volume of the Big Finish Productions audio Classic Doctors, New Monsters; "Night of the Vashta Nerada" sees the Fourth Doctor visiting a theme park that has unleashed the local Vashta Nerada after the planet's forests were torn down to allow the park to be constructed, and "Day of the Vashta Nerada" pits the Eighth Doctor against genetically-altered Vashta Nerada that have been created as a new weapon in the Time War.

Veil 
Veils are able to step into the bodies of others, controlling them. They can also induce a trance by touching their victims. This can be done with their extremely long tongue. In the episode, Prisoner of the Judoon, Androvax, the last Veil, was a fugitive responsible for destroying twelve planets, and was pursued by the Judoon after the Judoon prison ship containing him crashed on Earth. He then returned on the episode The Vault of Secrets, seeking help from Sarah Jane, Clyde and Rani due to the fact that he was ill and wanted to return to his own kind. Androvax was successful in awakening the survivors of the Veils as he searches for a new world for them to reside in.

In "Heaven Sent,"  the Twelfth Doctor encountered another creature that is a limping and disfigured creature in a shroud surrounded by flies also called the Veil while trapped in his Confession Dial. The creature modeled after an image of a rotting female corpse the Doctor saw in his childhood, the Veil's purpose is to force the Doctor to confess what he knew of the Hybrid.

Venom Grub

Venusian 
Venusians are inhabitants of the planet Venus, the closest planet to Earth. They had large feet, and six arms. The Third Doctor often employed a form of Venusian martial art (called Venusian aikido or Venusian karate) and sang Venusian lullabies (to the tune of God Rest Ye, Merry Gentlemen). Venusian aikido is allegedly very hard for two-armed beings to learn. Its use appeared in the serials Inferno, Day of the Daleks, and others. The Seventh Doctor favored a more subtle version which involved applying a single finger, seen in Survival. The Fourth Doctor revealed to Davros in Genesis of the Daleks that a battle between the Venusians and the Daleks "in the Space Year 17,000" was ended by the intervention of a group of battleships from the planet Hyperon. Although Venus today is utterly devoid of life, the Virgin Missing Adventures novel Venusian Lullaby shows Venus to have been inhabited billions of years ago, before the surface became too hot to support life.

Vervoid 

Artificially created plant-based humanoids who possess problem-solving intelligence and the power of speech; they were intended to perform tasks usually carried out by robots, but for a fraction of the cost. Unfortunately they instead decided to eradicate all of 'animalkind'. Vervoids had about the size and strength of humans, but were covered in leaves which provided them with energy through photosynthesis. They possessed thorns so poisonous they could kill a human on contact, and could produce copious amounts of methane-based swamp gas.

Vespiform 

Vespiform are an insectoid species resembling giant wasps, born en masse in hives in the Silfrax Galaxy. Each possesses the ability to morph into other species. It also has the ability to breed with other species, including humans, to produce offspring. The Monster Files feature establishes them as an ancient race and that they have fought the Quark rebels.

Vespiform have a telepathic connection to objects called firestones, which contains part of their mind. Like Earth's wasps, the Vespiform are vulnerable to water. A Vespiform-human hybrid can live a normal life as a human until a burst of intense emotion awakens its alien biology. When the Vespiform morphs into another species it emits a purple light.

In "The Unicorn and the Wasp", a Vespiform appears and goes on a killing spree in the style of Agatha Christie's murder mystery books. Eventually it turns out the reason for Vespiform's killings was due to his firestone in the possession of Lady Eddison, who was thinking about Christie's novels. Furthermore, the Vespiform is revealed to be Lady Eddison's illegitimate son: Reverend Golightly. In the end, trying to get the firestone back, the Vespiform dies chasing after the item when Donna Noble throws it into a lake.

The Vigil

Vinvocci 

Vinvocci are a race of spiky green aliens who first appeared in "The End of Time". A pair of Vinvocci came to Earth as part of a salvage operation to recover Vinvocci technology—a medical device for healing entire planets, which Joshua Naismith named the "Immortality Gate". They possess disguise technology referred to by the Tenth Doctor as a Shimmer. When the Doctor notes a similarity to Bannakaffalatta from Voyage of the Damned, noting the distinction that "he was small, and red", the Vinvocci are quick to differentiate themselves from the Zocci; both races may be at odds with each, explaining the response. They also find it racist when someone calls them cacti.

Viperox 

Insectoid creatures that attempted to destroy Earth in 1958, in the Dry Springs of Nevada.

Vishklar 

Vishklars are a species of humanoid aliens that feed on the energy from human nightmares. One Vishklar, known as The Nightmare Man, targeted Luke Smith, and found his dreams most intriguing, as he was genetically engineered by the Bane, and not a biological human and therefore should not be able to dream.

Visian 

Visians are invisible creatures indigenous to the planet Mira. They are completely invisible, detectable only by their footprints and the sounds they make while moving through the jungle. The Doctor states that they are 8 feet tall and extremely hostile, evidenced by the fact that they attack both the Doctor's party and the Daleks indiscriminately.

Viyrans 
A highly advanced race of creatures which specialise in virus experimentation.  They have featured in the Fifth Doctor Audio Story Mission of the Viyrans and the Sixth Doctor Audio Stories Patient Zero and Blue Forgotten Planet.  They also appeared in Dark Eyes 2.

Vogan 

The natives of the planet Voga, where it was entirely made of gold. The Cybermen sought to destroy their planet, to hinder the organics' ability to combat them in the Cyber Wars.

Voord 

A race of amphibious humanoids introduced in the First Doctor serial The Keys of Marinus (1964).

W

Wallarian 
A race mentioned in Carnival of Monsters, known for their gambling.

Weeping Angel

Weevil

Werewolf 

Two different kinds of werewolves have appeared in Doctor Who during the series' 50-year run. In "The Greatest Show in the Galaxy", a woman named Mag had been found by a blowhard explorer on one of his trips; Mag became feral and changed slightly into a more animalistic appearance in moonlight, simulated or real. The Seventh Doctor was able to encourage Mag to regain control of herself, something she wondered she would be able to do again.

In "Tooth and Claw" (2006), a bacterial life form was worshiped by a religious order, and wanted to establish the Empire of the Wolf by infecting Queen Victoria. The Tenth Doctor was able to destroy it and its host by overloading it with moonlight. However, he suspected that a tiny bit of the lifeform was able to sneak into the Queen through a cut on her finger; the Doctor guessed that the lifeform wouldn't pose a threat until the 21st century.

Whisper Men 

The Whisper Men are faceless beings who serve the Great Intelligence. They dress in Victorian attire and speak in rhyming whispers. Their faces are blank and white except for a mouth full of sharp teeth, and their hands can phase through a person's chest and stop their hearts at will. When the Great Intelligence inhabits one of the Whisper Men, it takes the form of Walter Simeon. The Whisper Men all vanish from existence when the Great Intelligence willingly destroys itself by scattering itself throughout the Eleventh Doctor's timeline at Trenzalore, the Doctor's final resting place.

Wirrn 

The Wirrn are an insectoid race that made their debut in the 1975 Fourth Doctor story The Ark in Space. The name is sometimes spelled Wirrrn, which is a spelling originating from the novelisation of the story.

The Wirrn claim to have originated from Andromeda (whether they meant the galaxy, the constellation, or even a planet named "Andromeda" is unclear), but were driven into space by human settlers. They are slightly larger than humans, dark green and wasp-like in appearance, and live mostly in space, although their breeding colonies are terrestrial. Their bodies are a self-contained system, their lungs being able to recycle waste carbon dioxide and only needing to touch down occasionally on planetary bodies for food and oxygen. The Wirrn's life cycle involves laying their eggs in living hosts; the larvae emerge to consume the host, absorbing its memories and knowledge. A Wirrn larva is a green slug-like creature, varying in size from a few inches to 1 or 2 metres across. It can "infect" another organism through contact with a substance it excretes, mutating them into an adult Wirrn and connecting their consciousness to the hive mind.

In The Ark in Space, the Wirrn found Space Station Nerva in orbit around an Earth devastated centuries before by solar flares. The survivors had lain in suspended animation waiting for the planet to recover, but had overslept by several millennia. The Wirrn intended to use the sleepers as a food source and claim the empty Earth for their own, as both a means of survival and an act of revenge against the human race for taking their former territories. In the course of their plan, Noah, leader of Nerva, was infected and converted to their kind. However, Noah still retained "more than a vestige of human spirit", probably thanks to the encouragements of the Doctor, and led the Wirrn into Nerva's transport ship even though he knew it was rigged to explode. It did so, ending the Wirrn threat.

The Wirrn have also appeared in the Eighth Doctor Adventures novel Placebo Effect by Gary Russell, and in the audio play Wirrn: Race Memory, produced by BBV. Big Finish used them in the audio stories Wirrn Dawn with the Eighth Doctor and Wirrn Isle with the Sixth. A dead Wirrn appears briefly in television story The Stones of Blood.

Wolfweed

Wyrrester 
An alien species, which resemble giant scorpions; they appear in the novel The Crawling Terror. According to the Twelfth Doctor, the Wyrresters are warmongers that have ravaged their entire star system; their venom has a hypnotic suggestion effect. Attempting to depart from their star system once it was out of habitable planets, the Wyrresters sent out a message in the 1940s, which was picked up by the Germans and the Allied Forces; the message contained instructions on how to build a teleportation device. Adolf Hitler believed it was a super weapon gifted to him by the heavens, but the British scientists knew better. Though the Doctor attempted to stop the experiment, a Wyrrester got through and stung a scientist before being slain by a bombing; this resulted in 70 years of experimentation trying to bring the minds of the Wyrresters to Earth via inhabiting mutated insect bodies. The Doctor's past self arrived to discover the situation, and time traveled to discover what had happened. With the aid of the local military, the Doctor was able to prevent the Wyrresters from teleporting by destroying the device.

X

Xeraphin 

The Xeraphin were an ancient species encountered by the Fifth Doctor in the story Time-Flight (1982) by Peter Grimwade. Originating from the planet Xeriphas, they possessed immense psychokinetic and scientific powers. The Doctor believed the race to have been wiped out during the crossfire during the Vardon/Kosnax war. Instead, the entire race fled to Earth in an escaping spacecraft. The ship crashed near present-day Heathrow some 140 million years ago. When the Xeraphin emerged they built a Citadel to mark their new home but the Xeraphin were so plagued with radiation that they abandoned their original humanoid bodies and transformed into a single bioplasmic gestalt intelligence within a sarcophagus at the heart of the Citadel.

The arrival of the Master coincided with their emergence from the gestalt state when the radiation effects had subsided, and his influence caused the emergence of a split personality of good and evil, each side competing for their tremendous power while yearning to become a proper species once again. The Master, who was stranded on Earth at the time too, succeeded in capturing the Xeraphin as a new power source for his TARDIS. However, the Doctor's intervention meant his nemesis' TARDIS was sent to Xeriphas where events became out of his control.

Before fleeing Xeriphas and the Xeraphin, the Master took with him Kamelion, a Xeraphin war weapon with advanced shape-changing abilities dependent on the will of its controller. Kamelion was freed from the Master and joined the Doctor's TARDIS crew in The King's Demons (1983).

Xeron

Xylok 

Xyloks are a crystalline race that crashed into Earth as a meteorite about 60 million years ago. Consequently, the Xyloks that survived the crash were trapped beneath the surface of the Earth, regrowing over thousands of millennia.

After the eruption of mount Krakatoa in 1883, one of the Xyloks was found in the post-volcanic aftermath. It was eventually passed to Sarah Jane Smith by a geologist friend when she was researching volcanic activity, 18 months prior to the events of The Lost Boy. During her studies of the crystalline structure, she found that it could use her laptop to communicate. The Xylok agreed to help Sarah Jane protect Earth, and was integrated into the supercomputer Mr Smith, built by Sarah Jane under the instruction of the Xylok. Unbeknownst to Sarah Jane, this was a plot, in anticipation that it would one day be able to release the imprisoned Xylok race. Sarah Jane and her companions were able to thwart its intentions; as a result, Mr Smith was reprogrammed and became a benefit to the human race once again.

Z

Zanak Humanoid

Zaralok 

The Zaralok was a shark-like creature that prowled the waters around the flooded 23rd-century London, now little more than a network of underwater tunnels codenamed 'Poseidon'. When the Doctor and Amy land the TARDIS in Poseidon, the Zaralok immediately attacks, attempting to ram its way into the glass tunnels. While constantly having to evade the monster, the two slowly unravell the mystery of Poseidon, which has fallen under threat from not only the Zaralok, but also the Vashta Nerada and otherworldly radiation. They eventually discover that all the anomalies arrived at the city when the USS Eldridge, an American WWII-era ship which had vanished through a wormhole to another world hundreds of years ago, suddenly jumped back through into the sea several days ago. However, the ship became lodged in the wormhole and held it open, allowing the creatures and the radiation to seep through. The Doctor and Amy travel to the wreckage of the Eldridge and are able to close the wormhole; the Zaralok is seen being dragged back to its own world, while the other anomalies disappear with it. The name of the creature is probably derived from Žralok, a shark in Slovak or Czech language.

Zarbi 

The Zarbi appeared in the 1965 First Doctor story The Web Planet written by Bill Strutton, and are an ant-like insectoid species, with some characteristics associated with beetles, from the planet Vortis, which were controlled by the power of the Animus. They are roughly eight feet long, and the Menoptra claim that they are "little more than cattle".

They possess little intelligence but were not at all aggressive until the Animus arrived. They were enslaved to the alien consciousness and considered the butterfly-like Menoptra their mortal enemies. Only they could control the woodlouse-like venom grubs, also known as larvae guns.

They returned to their normal ways after the Animus was defeated by the First Doctor, Ian Chesterton, Barbara Wright and Vicki. It is presumed that the various species on Vortis are now living peacefully together.

A Zarbi and a Menoptra were shown on cover of the first edition of Doctor Who Annual in September 1965 along with two other Doctor Who alien races, a Voord and a Sensorite.

Zocci 

The Zocci are a diminutive race of red spiked aliens. Voyage of the Damned featured a Zocci named Bannakaffalatta. His species was first named in "The End of Time", where the Vinvocci are quick to differentiate themselves from the Zocci.

Zolfa-Thuran 
A race of intelligent cacti from the planet Zolfa-Thura.  Meglos, from the episode of the same name, was the last surviving member of the species.

Z’ros 
These aliens are referenced in Michael Feeney Callan's The Children of January in February 1986. The Z’ros are a race of proto-human like bees who are a non-mercyful race and love wars.

Zygon

See also

 List of Doctor Who villains
 List of Doctor Who henchmen
 List of Doctor Who robots

References

External links
 The Bumper Book of Doctor Who Monsters, Villains & Alien Species
 Children of the Earth BBC Torchwood site
 

Creatures and aliens
Doctor Who
Doctor Who universe creatures and aliens
 
Doctor Who lists
Creatures and aliens